This is an alphabetical list of known Hindi songs performed, sung and/or recorded by Mohammed Rafi between 1942 and 1980. Over 5,000 of his songs are listed here. Mohammed Rafi also sang in several different languages other than Hindi such as Punjabi, Marathi etc. Some of which are also listed here.

M 
(564)

 "Maa Hain Mohabbat Ka Naam (Solo - Madan Mohan Kohli/Kaifi Azmi) - Maa Ka Aanchal 1970"
 "Maa Jag Tere Charano Mein Aayo Bholi Maa (Prayer Omi and Diraj Kaur - Sonik-Omi) - Bhakti Mein Shakti 1977"      [Maa Saach Darbar Ki Jai ...]
 "Maa Maa Karta Phire Laadla (Solo - Adi Narayana Rao/Bharat Vyas) - Suvarna Sundari II 1958"
 "Maa Maa Karta Phire Ladla Maa Maa Kare Pukar (Solo - Addi Narayan Rao) - Suvarna Sundari 1958"
 "Maa Na Maray Bachapan Mein Kisi Ki Maa Na Maray 2 (Duet Asha Bhosle as Child - S. S. Mohinder) - Zameen Ke Tare 1960"
 "Maa Na Maray Bachapan Mein, Kisi Ki Maa Na Maray 1 (Solo - S. Mohinder/Pt. Indra) - Zameen Ke Tare 1960"
 "Maa Sirf Naata Nahi (Solo - Laxmikant-Pyarelal/Anand Bakshi) - Amar Akbar Anthony 1977"
 "Maa Tere Darbaar (Punjabi Solo - Sonik Omi/Inderjeet Singh Tulsi) - Mata Diya Bhetan Vol. 2 ****"
 "Maa Tere Darbaar Jhuke Sara Sansar (Prayer Solo - Sonik-Omi/Inderjeet Singh Tulsi) - Bhakti Mein Shakti 1978"      [Maa Ae Jotawali Ae Latawali Ae ...]
 "Maa Tujhe Dhoondu Kahan Maine Mamta Ko Pehchana (Solo - Laxmikant-Pyarelal/Anand Bakshi) - Maa 1976"
 "Maadre Watan Ae Maadre Watan 1 (Solo - Iqbal/Farooq Qaiser) - Sipahsalar 1956"
 "Maadre Watan Ae Maadre Watan 2 (Solo - Iqbal/Farooq Qaiser) - Sipahsalar 1956"
 "Maae Na Wat Poonian Doli (Punjabi Solo - Surinder Kohli/Ravinder Singh Peepal) - Sadda Chirhian Da Chamba and Doli Songs **** and Long Da Lishkara and Chann Pardesi ****"
 "Maajhi Chal O Maajhi Chal Tu Chale To Chham Chham Baaje Maujon Ki Payal (Multi Lata Mangeshkar and Asha Bhosle -  Laxmikant-Pyarelal/Anand Bakshi) - Aya Sawan Jhoom Ke 1969"
 "Maan Bhi Jaao Sanam (Solo - Sonik-Omi/C. L. Rawal) - Ladki Pasand Hai 1971"
 "Maan Gaye Ustaad Tum Ko Maan Gaye (Multi Father-Children Paheli Chandrani Mukherjee and Dilraj Kaur - Sonik-Omi/Verma Malik) - Maan Gaye Ustad 1981"      [Mera Ek Sawal Hain Sawal Ka Jawab Do Yeh Main Tum Pe Chhodta Hoon Achha Do Ya Bura Do ...]
 "Maan Jaiye Maan Jaiye Baat Mere Dil Ki Jaan Jayiye (Duet Asha Bhosle - Laxmikant-Pyarelal/Anand Bakshi) - Himmat 1970"
 "Maan Mera Ehsan Are Nadaan Maine Tujh Se Kiya Hain Pyar (Solo - Naushad Ali/Shakeel Badayuni) - Aan I 1952"
 "Maang Ke Saath Tumhara Maine Maang Liya Sansaar (Horse-Cart Asha Bhosle - O. P. Nayyar/Sahir Ludhianvi) - Naya Daur 1957"
 "Maang Raha Hain Hindustan (Patriotic Solo - Shyam Sundar/Qamar Jalalabadi) - Bazaar 1949"
 "Maangi Mohabbat, Mili Yeh Judai, Maangi Mohabbat, Mili Yeh Judai, Duniyawale Teri Duhai, Teri Duhai, Maangi Mohabbat, Mili Yeh Judai, Duniyawale Teri Duhai, Teri Duhai (Solo - Husnlal-Bhagatram/Qamar Jalalabadi) - Guanaa 1950"      [Tute Huye Dil Se Mere, Awaz Yeh Aayi, Bhagwan Na, Dushman Ko Bhi De, Dard-E-Judai ...]
 "Maango Na Paisa, Maango Na Paisa, Maango Na Paisa, Maango Na Paisa, Hoy, Maango Na Paisa, Sage Baap Se, Yeh Kehta Hoon Main Aap Se, Bach Ke Rehna Iss Paap Se, Maango Na Paisa, Maango Na Paisa, Maango Na Paisa Sage Baap Se (Solo - Sardul Kwatra/Vishwamitra Adil-Verma Malik) - Char Minar 1956"
 "Maar Gayo Re (Multi Anand Kumar C. and Runa Laila - Bappi Lahiri/Gauhar Kanpuri) - Jaan E Bahaar 1979"
 "Maarenge Kas Kas Ke Baan Saiyan (Duet Asha Bhosle - Roshan Lal/Ravindra Krishan) - Jashan 1955"
 "Maathe Ki Bindiya Bole 1 (Duet Anuradha Paudwal - Bappi Lahiri/Farooq Qaiser) - Lahu Ke Do Rang 1979"
 "Maathe Ki Bindiya Bole 2 (Duet Anuradha Paudwal - Bappi Lahiri/Farooq Qaiser) - Lahu Ke Do Rang 1979"
 "Maati Ke Jalte Deepak (Solo - Vijay Singh/Dev Kohli) - Khoon Khoon 1973"
 "Maaya Ki Uljhanon Ko Hairan (Solo - - Chitragupt/Gopal Singh Nepali) - Shiv Bhakt 1955"
 "Maayus Baagbaan Ko Chaman (Solo - Iqbal Qureshi/Ayaz Saheli) - Sultaan E Hind 1978"
 "Maayus To Hoon Vaade Se Tere Kuchh Aas Nahni Kuchh Aas Bhi Hain Main Apane Khyaalo Ke Sadake Tu Paas Nahin Aur Paas Bhi Hain Maayus To Hun (Solo - Roshan Lal/Sahir Ludhianvi) - Barsaat Ki Raat 1960"
 "Madhosh Hawa Matwali Fiza (Solo - Shankar-Jaikishan/Farooq Qaiser) - Prince 1969"
 "Madhuban Mein Radhika Nache Re Girdhar Ki Muraliya Baje Re (Classical Duet Ameer Khan - Naushad Ali/Shakeel Badayuni) - Kohinoor 1960"      [Aa Aa Aa ...]
 "Madhur Preet Sangeet (Duet Suman Kalyanpur - Shri Nath Tripathi/Bharat Vyas) - Chandramukhi 1960"
 "Madine Ke Galiya (Naat Solo - Unknown/Unknown) - Unknown ****"         [Har Ek Shay Se Allah Har Ek Shay Se Akbar Har Ek Shay Se Badhkar ...]
 "Madine Wale Se Mera Salaam (Prayer Duet Bande Hasan - Hafiz Khan/Shewan Rizvi) - Mera Salaam 1957"
 "Magar Yeh Haseenayein Bekhabar (Duet Sulochana Kadam - Shyam Sundar/Aziz Kashmiri) - Dholak 1951"
 "Mahabharat Katha (Solo - Chitragupt/Bharat Vyas) - Mahabharat 1965"
 "Mahi Lao Ki Naav Par (Duet Manna Dey - Bulo C. Rani-S. Mohinder/N. Sharma) - Sunehre Kadam 1966"
  "Mahima Shri Ram Ki  ( Duet Govind Prasad Jaipurwale - Govind Naresh/B D Mishra) - Mahima Shri Ram Ki (Shelved) 1975"
 "Mai Ke Se Aaja Bibi Ri, ..Mai Ke Se Aaja Bibi Ri, Teri Yaad Mein Ho Gayi Tibi, ..Mai Ke Se Aaja Bibi Ri, Teri Yaad Mein Ho Gayi Tibi, Kheer Samajh Kar Kha Loonga Tere Galichon Ko Main Biwi, Mai Ke Se Aaja Bibi Ri, Teri Yaad Mein Ho Gayi Tibi (Funny Solo - Ravi/) - Devar Bhabhi 1958"      [Tasveer Teri Dil Mera Bahela Naa Sakegi, Mar Jaaoonga Mai Ke Jo Tu Aa Naa Sakegi ...]
 "Main Aisa Ek Khilona, Main Aisa Ek Khilona, Ghoom Jaaoon, Jhoom Jaaoon, Kidhar Bhi Mud Jaaoon, Par Main Nahin Girne Ka, Are Kabhi Nahin Girneka, Main Aisa Ek Khilona, Main Aisa Ek Khilona (Solo - Laxmikant-Pyarelal/Rajendra Krishan) - Shaandar 1974"      [Hun Hun Hun Hun ...]
 "Main Akela Ja Raha Tha (Solo - Ravi/Rajendra Krishan) - Gauri 1968"
 "Main Albela Home Guard (Solo - Kalyanji-Anandji/Indeevar) - Johar In Kashmir 1966"
 "Main Albela Jawan Hoon Rangila Aye Dil Manzeel Hain Pyar Ki Jhoom Jhoom Gaoon Najare Pe Chhaoon Sanam Mehfil Bahaar Ki (Solo - Shankar-Jaikishan/Hasrat Jaipuri) - Humrahi 1963"
 "Main Apne Aap Se Ghabra Gaya Hoon Mujhe Aye Zindagi Diwana Kar De (Solo - Iqbal Qureshi/Rajendra Krishan) - Bindiya 1960"
 "Main Badi Mushkil Mein Hoon (Solo - Laxmikant Pyrelal) - Pocket Maar 1974"      [Na Tujh Se Door Ja Sakoon Na Tere Paas Aa Sakoon Ke ...]
 "Main Bahut Door Chala (Solo - Ram Kadam/Ibrahim Faiz) - Raaste Aur Manzil 1968"
 "Main Bairagi Nachoon Gaaon (Duet Lata Mangeshkar - Kalyanji-Anandji/Anand Bakshi) - Bairaag 1976"
 "Main Baje Wala Bawa Na Bhoot Na Koyi Chalawa Usi Ka Beda Par Lage Jo Sune Meri Sargam BuamChiki Bum (Solo - Ravi/Shakeel Badayuni) - Mulzim 1963" (Rafi Sings for Raj Kapoor)
 "Main Bambai Ka Babu Naam Mera Anjaana English Dhoon Mein Gaoon Main Hindustani Gaana Hey (Patriotic Swing - O. P. Nayyar/Sahir Ludhianvi) - Naya Daur 1957"
 "Main Bandar Hoon Shahar Ka (Solo - C. Ramchandra/Rajendra Krishan) - Insaniyat 1955"
 "Main Banjara Door Ka (Solo - N. Dutta aka Datta Naik/Sahir Ludhianvi) - Naach Ghar 1959"
 "Main Bewafa Nahin Hoon Tere Pyar Ki Kasam Ikraar Jo Kiya Usi Ikraar Ki Kasam (Solo - Kalyanji-Anandji/Qamar Jalalabadi) - Preet Na Jane Reet 1964"
 "Main Bhi Jawan Hoon Tum Bhi Jawan Ho (Duet Geeta Dutt - B. S. Kalla/Pandit Indra) - Do Dulhe 1955"
 "Main Buddha Hoon (Solo - Usha Khanna/Asad Bhopali) - Night In Calcutta 1970"
 "Main Chahoon To Haye Nazaaro Ko Mohabbat (Multi Asha Bhosle and Sharda Sinha - Datta Naik/Shamshul Huda Bihari-Khalik-Aziz Kasmiri-Shad Fidayi) - Ganga 1974"
 "Main Chali Main Chali Peeche Peeche Jahaan Yeh Na Poocho Kidhar Yeh Na Poocho Kahaan (Train Lata Mangeshkar - Shankar-Jaikishan/Shailendra) - Professor 1962 and East Is East 1999"
 "Main Chalta Hoon Mujhe Jaane Do (Duet Asha Bhosle - R. D. Burman/Anand Bakshi) - Raksha 1981"
 "Main Choom Loon Ye Aadaaye Zaraa Kareeb Aaoo Tumhe Gale Se Lagaayen (Duet Usha Khanna - Usha Khanna/Kafil Azar) - Aa Jaa Sanam 1975"
 "Main Deep Jalaye Baitha Hoon (Urdu Ghazal Solo - Rajeshwar Pal/Naqsh Lyallpuri) - Rafi Aye Jaan E Ghazal ****"
 "Main Dhoondhati Hoon, Kahan Ho Sanam, Nazar Nazar Bahek Rahi Hain Aaj, JhoomaKe Ga Rahin Hain Zindagi, Ek Bas Teri Kami Hain Sanam, Pukarata Hain Dil Tujhe Sanam Sanam, Nazar Nazar Chahek Rahin Hain Aaj, Ched Le Mastiyon Ki Ragani, Main Hoon Jab Tere Liye To Kya Hain Ghum (Swing Duet Geeta Dutt or Asha Bhosle - O. P. Nayyar/Majrooh Sultanpuri) - Shrimati 420 [Four Twenty] 1956"
 "Main Dil Tainu, Main Dil Tainu (Punjabi Usha Mangeshkar - Roshan Lal) - Daku Jagat Singh 1983"
 "Main Ek Raja Hoon, Tu Ek Rani Hain, Prem Nagar Ki, Yeh Ek Sundar, Prem Kahani Hain, Main Ek Raja Hoon O O O (Solo - Laxmikant-PyarelalAnand Bakshi) - Uphaar 1971"
 "Main Gaoon Tum So Jao Sukh Sapano Mein Kho Jao 1 (Children Solo - Shankar-Jaikishan/Shailendra) - Brahmachari 1968 and Mohammed Rafi Collection Vol. 4 and 5 ****"      [La La Lara La La ...]
 "Main Gaoon Tum So Jao Sukh Sapano Mein Kho Jao 2 (Children Solo - Shankar-Jaikishan/Shailendra) - Brahmachari 1968"      [La La Lara La La ...]
 "Main Gwalo Rakhwalo Maiyya (Non-Filmy Solo - Khaiyyaam/Unknown) - and This Is Mohd Rafi Saab -Ghazala And Bhajans **** and Tere Bharose Nandlal 1991"
 "Main Hoon Alladin Mere Paas Hain Chirag-E-Gin ..Ek Do Teen Chaar (Multi Chitlkar and Lata Mangeshkar - C. Ramchandra/Pyare Lal Santoshi) - Sargam 1950"
 "Main Hoon Ashiq Tere Geet Ka (Multi Jaspal Singh, Pascal Paul, Jagat Singh Jagga, Sudarshan Pandit and Asha Bhosle - Sardar Malik-Prem Nath/Qamar Jalalabadi) - Gyaani Ji 1977"
 "Main Hoon Baanka Chhabila Jawan Re (Duet Asha Bhosle - Nisar Bazmi/Saba Afghani) - Halla Gulla 1954"
 "Main Hoon Bhola Byopari (Solo - S. D. Burman/Shailendra) - Miya Bibi Razi 1960"
 "Main Hoon Ganwaar (Solo - Naushad Ali/Rajendra Krishan) - Ganwaar 1970"
 "Main Hoon Gori Naagan (Duet Lata Mangeshkar - Chitragupt/Majrooh Sultanpuri) - Naache Nagin Baje Been 1960"
 "Main Hoon Haseen (Duet Asha Bhosle - Shyamji-Ghanshyamji/Majrooh Sultanpuri) - Harfan Maula 1976"
 "Main Hoon Jaipur Ki Banjaran (Duet Lalita Dewoolkar - C. RamChandra/Qamar Jalalabadi) - Saajan 1947"
 "Main Hoon Jani Tera (Solo - Shankar-Jaikishan/Hasrat Jaipuri) - Bhai Bhai 1970"
 "Main Hoon Kaun ..Yeh Tujh Ko Nahin Hain Pata (Qawali Manna Dey - Kalyanji-Anandji/Anjaan) - Ahinsa II 1979"      [Are Sar Uthega, Sar Uthega Jo Bhi Mere Samne Kat Jayega, Haan, Teri Aankhon Par Bada Parda Hain Jo Hat Jayega Ha Ha Ha..Rukh Zara Awaaz Neechi, Yun Garajana Chhod De, Jo Garajate Hain Iss Tarah Woh Barasate Hain Nahin, Are Tu Hain Kaun Main Aa ...]
 "Main Hoon Mr. John (Duet Geeta Dutt - N. Dutta aka Datta Naik/Sahir Ludhianvi) - Naach Ghar 1959"
 "Main Hoon Mr. Johny, Main Ne Sab Mulkon Ka Piya Hain Pani, Sari Duniya Ghoom Ghoom Ke, Bana Hoon Hindustani (Patriotic Swing - O. P. Nayyar/Qamar Jalalabadi) - Mai Baap 1957"
 "Main Hoon Papa Khan  (Business Duet Suman Kalyanpur - Kalyanji Veerji Shah/Pyare Lal Santoshi) - Post Box 999 (Nine Hundred Ninety Nine) 1958"
 "Main Hoon Saaki Tu Hain Sharabi Sharabi, Tu Ne Aankhon Se Pilayi Woh Nasha Hain Ke Duhai, Har Tarf Dil Ke Chaman Mein Phool Bikhare Hain Gulabi Gulabi Gulabi (Duet Lata Mangeshkar -  Naushad Ali/Shakeel Badayuni) - Ram Aur Shyam 1967"
 "Main Hoon Tera Geet Gori Tu Hi Meri Taan Hai Tu Hi Meri Jaan Hai (Duet Asha Bhosle - Sonik-Omi/Qamar Jalalabadi) - Mahua 1969"
 "Main Hoon Tera Prem Aur Tu Ho Meri Praan (Qawali Duet Manna Dey - Kalyanji-Anandji/Verma Malik) - Rahu Ketu 1978"      [Are Jab Aankh Se Aankh Mile To ...]
 "Main Hoon Tere Pyar Ki Maina (Duet Shamshad Begum - Shri Nath Tripathi/Hasrat Jaipuri) - Dilli Darbar 1956"
 "Main Idhar Jaoon Ye Udhar Jaoon (Qawali Manna Dey and Asha Bhosle - Naushad Ali/Shakeel Badayuni) - Palki 1967"      [Aa Aa Aa Bhari Mehfil Mein Cheda Hain Kisi Ne ...]
 "Main In Pe Marta Hoon (Duet Asha Bhosle - R. D. Burman/Majrooh Sultanpuri) - Teesri Manzil 1966"      [Dekhiye Sahibo Woh Koi Aur Thi Aur Yeh Nazani Hai Meri ...]
 "Main Is Masoom Chehre Ko (Duet Suman Kalyanpur - Bipin Datta/Noor Devasi) - Baghi Shahzada 1964"
 "Main Is Paar Tu Us Paar (Duet Lata Mangeshkar - Kalyanji-Anandji/Kavi Pradeep) - Agni Rekha 1973"
 "Main Jaadugar Hoon Kaarigar Hoon (Business Solo - Vinod/Deena Nath Madhok) - Oot Pataang 1955"
 "Main Jaadugar Matwala (Duet Shamshad Begum - Avinash Vyas/Bharat Vyas) - Bhakta Raj 1960"
 "Main Jaan Gayi Tujhe Sainyan Hut Chhod De Mori Bainyaan (Duet Shamshad Begum - O. P. Nayyar/Hasrat Jaipuri) - Howrah Bridge 1958"
 "Main Jab Chhedoon Prem Tarana (Duet Mohantara Talpade - Firoz Nizami/Pandit Phani) - Amar Raj 1946"
 "Main Jat Yamla Pagla Deewana (Solo - Laxmikant Pyarelal/Anand Bakshi) - Pratiggya 1975"
 "Main Jat Yamla Pagla Deewana (Solo - Varma Malik) - Yamla Jatt 1964"
 "Main Jeeta, Jag Hara (Solo - Bullo C. Rani/Kumud Tripathi) - Jeevan Saathi 1957"
 "Main Jungle Ka Raja (Duet Lata Mangeshkar - Laxmikant-Pyarelal/Anand Bakshi) - Maa 1976"
 "Main Kab Gaata Pyar Kisi Ka Gaata Hain (Solo - Unknown) - Geets For Ever 1979"
 "Main Kah Do Tum Ko Chor To (Duet Suraiya - Husnlal-Bhagatram/Qamar Jalalabadi) - Sanam 1951"
 "Main Kahin Kavi Na Ban Jaoon Tere Pyar Mein Ae Kavita (Solo - Shankar-Jaikishan/Hasrat Jaipuri) - Pyar Hi Pyar 1969 and Mohammed Rafi Collection Vol. 5 ****"
 "Main Kaise Kahoongi More Raja (Duet Asha Bhosle - Shri Nath Tripathi/B. D. Mishra) - Ratna Manjari 1955"
 "Main Kaise Keh Doon (Duet Amirbai - S. Mohinder/Unknown) - Jeevan Sathi 1949"
 "Main Kal Milungi (Duet Lata Mangeshkar - S. D. Burman/Majrooh Sultanpuri) - Dr. Vidya 1962"
 "Main Kaun ..Jauadoogar, Tu Kaun ..Main Tera Jaadoo, Allah Allah Jaadoogar Baatein Mat Kar, Kartab Dikha Koi Tu (Business Magic Show Kishore Kumar and Asha Bhosle - R. D. Burman) - Dushman Dost 1981"      [Chhoo Chameli Chhoo, ..Chhoo Chameli Chhoo, ...]
 "Main Kaun Hoon Main Kahan Hoon Mujhe Yeh Hosh Nahin (Solo - Chitragupt/Rajendra Krishan) - Main Chup Rahungi 1962"
 "Main Khidki Pe Aaoongi (Duet Asha Bhosle - O. P. Nayyar/Qamar Jalalabadi) - Kalpana 1960"
 "Main Kho Gaya Yahin Kahin Jawan Hai Rut Sama  Kahaan Dil Kise Pata Kahaan Hoon Main Khabar Nahin (Outdoor Solo - O. P. Nayyar/Majrooh Sultanpuri) - 12 O'Clock 1957"      [Whistle ...]
 "Main Koi Jhoot Boleya (Punjabi Duet S. Balbir Singh Aatish - Salil Chowdhary/Prem Dhawan) - 50 Glorious Years Of Punjabi Music Vol. 1 ****"
 "Main Main Qartoon, Baj Laga Hain Baar Baar Dil Ka Telephoone 1 (Multi Swing Asha Bhosle and Shamshad Begum - O. P. Nayyar/Hasrat Jaipuri) - Mr. Qartoon M. A. 1958"      [Main ...]
 "Main Main Qartoon, Baj Laga Hain Baar Baar Dil Ka Telephoone 2 (Multi Swing Asha Bhosle and Shamshad Begum - O. P. Nayyar/Hasrat Jaipuri) - Mr. Qartoon M. A. 1958"    [Hum Ghulam Aap Ke Li Jiye Bandagi, Aap Ke Karam Se Hain Humari Zindagi, Yeh Jahaan Jayega Kisi Ka Deharadoon ..Main Main Main Main ...]
 "Main Marne Chala Hoon (Solo - Shankar-Jaikishan/Hasrat Jaipuri) - Gunahon Ka Devta 1967"
 "Main Nahin Manunga Maati Ke Putle Ko Bhagwan, Tum Chaho To Kayar Ban Kar Sahelo Yeh Apmaan (Prayer Solo - N. Dutta aka Datta Naik/Sahir Ludhianvi) - Chandrakanta 1956"      [Lakh Baar Dhikkar Hain Tujh Par, O Nirlaj Insaan, Jhook Gaya Attyachaar Ke Aage Tera Dharm Imaan, Main Nahin Manoonga ...]
 "Main Nashe Mein Hoon (Solo - Ghulam Mohammadd/Majrooh Sultanpuri) - Do Gunde 1959"
 "Main Ne Aye Jane Wafa Tumse Mohabbat Ki Hain Tum Ne Ek Dard Mujhe De Ke Qayamat Ki Hain (Duet Suman Kalyanpur - Roshan Lal/Shakeel Badayuni) - Bedaagh 1965"
 "Main Ne Chand Aur Sitaron Ki Tammana Ki Thi, Main Ne Chaand Aur Sitaron Ki Tammana Ki Thi, Mujh Ko Raton Ki Sihai Ke Siwa Kuchch Na Mila, Main Ne Chaand Aur Sitaron Ki Tammana Ki Thi (Solo - N. Dutta aka Datta Naik/Sahir Ludhianvi) - Chandrakanta 1956"
 "Main Ne Chand Dekha Hain, Jhilmila Te Sitaron Mein, Koi Phool Dekha Hain, Muskurati Baharon Mein (Piano Solo  - Laxmikant-Pyarelal/Anand Bakshi) - Woh Din Yaad Karo 1971"
 "Main Ne Jab Se Tujhe Aye Jaan E Ghazal Dekha Hain (Urdu Ghazal Solo - Taj Ahmad Khan/Saba Afgani) - Mohd. Rafi Ghazals Vol. 2 ****"
 "Main Ne Kab Chaha Ki Main Dulha Banoonga, Ban Hi Gaya To Thik Hain, ..O Chham Se Nachoongi, Rasile Rangile Saiyan Ji, O Jo Na Mile Aur Jo Milta Hain Tere Sang Mujh Ko Bhi Sab Chalta Hain, Maine Bhi Na Socha Ke Dulha Milega, Mil Hi Gaya To Thik Hain (Duet Asha Bhosle - R. D. Burman/Majrooh Sultanpuri) - Kahtey Hai Mujh Ko Raja 1975"      [O Chamake ..Nachani Soniye Yehin Hain Zindagi, Jo Na Mile Aur Jo Milta Hain, Mast Malang Ko Sab Chalta Hain, ...]
 "Main Ne Kaha Babu Ji, O Maine Kaha Bab Jji, Itna Bataoge O Dil Mera, O Dil Mera Tod Ke Chale To Na Jaoge, O Dil Mera, O Dil Mera Tod Ke Chale To Na Jaoge (Duet Lata Mangeshkar - Husnlal-Bhagatram/Qamar Jalalabadi) - Chhoti Bhabhi 1950"
 "Main Ne Kaha Ji (Duet Geeta Dutt - Hansraj Behl/Prem Dhawan) - Milan 1958"
 "Main Ne Kaha Miss What Is This (Duet Asha Bhosle - O. P. Nayyar/Qamar Jalalabadi) - Mitti Mein Sona 1960"
 "Main Ne Kaha Suno (Duet Suman Kalyanpur - Sardul Kwatra/Aziz Kashmiri) - Gypsy Girl 1961"
 "Main Ne Kaha Tha Aana Sunday Ko Sunday Ko Monday Ko Chale Aaye Kyun Milna Jo Chahe Dil Tum Se Ji Tumse Ji Tum Se To Bolo Kya Karoon (Duet Asha Bhosle - Ravi/Asad Bhopali) - Ustadon Ke Ustad 1963"      [Pineapple ..Papaiya Papaiya Papaiya ..Le Banana Coconut Coconut ...]
 "Main Ne Kuche Mein Zalim (Duet S. Balbir - Hansraj Behl/Raja Mehdi Ali Khan) - Inquilab 1956"
 "Main Ne Pee Hain Pee Hain Pee Hain Par Main To Nashe Mein Nahin Sirf Tu Hai Haseen (Solo - Bipin Babul/Vishwamitra Adil)- Raat Ke Raahi 1959"
 "Main Ne Pee Na Seekh Liya, Paap Kaho Ya Punya Kaho (Duet Lata Mangeshkar - Vasant Desai/Bharat Vyas) - Goonj Uthi Shehnai 1959"      [Ik Zindagi Ke Mod Pe Saathi Bichhad Gaya Pyaale Mein Aaa Gayi Meri Duniya Tammam Hain  ..Wah Wah Wah Wah Wah Kya ...]
 "Main Ne Pee Sharaab, Tum Ne Kya Piya, Are Tum Ne Kya Piya, Admi Ka Khoon (Solo - N. Datta aka Datta Naik/Sahir Ludhianvi) - Naya Raasta 1970"
 "Main Ne Poochha Chand Se (Solo - R. D. Burman/Anand Bakshi)- Abdullah II 1980"
 "Main Ne Rakkha Hain Mohabbat Apne Afsane Ka Naam (Solo - Usha Khanna/Javed Anwar) - Shabnam 1964"      [Yaahbibi Yaahbibi ..Ae Ae Ae ...]
 "Main Ne Sau Baar Khayalon Ke (Solo - Ravindra Jain/Naqsh Lyallpuri) - Parchaiyan 1980"
 "Main Ne Shayad Tumhein Pehle Bhi Kahin Dekha Hain (Solo - Roshan Lal/Sahir Ludhianvi) - Barsaat Ki Raat 1960"
 "Main Ne Socha Tha Agar Maut Se Pehle Pehle, Maine Socha Tha Agar Duniya Ki Viranon Mein, Maine Socha Tha Agar Hashti Ki Samshanon Mein (Urdu Ghazal Solo - Babul Supriyo or Ananda Shankar and Reminder Kaushal/Nyaya Sharma) - Mohd. Rafi Ghazals Vol. 2 **** and Ghazals - Mohammed Rafi By SAREGAMA ****"
 "Main Ne to Maangi Hai Bas Yeh Dua 1 (Duet Kishore Kumar - Rajesh Roshan) - Duniya Meri Jeb Mein 1979"
 "Main Ne to Maangi Hai Bas Yeh Dua 2 (Duet Kishore Kumar - Rajesh Roshan) - Duniya Meri Jeb Mein 1979"
 "Main Ne Tujh Se Kiya Hain Pyaar (Solo - Usha Khanna/Asad Bhopali) - Khoj 1971"
 "Main Ne Tujhe Jeet Liya Tune Mujhe (Duet Asha Bhosle - Laxmikant-Pyarelal/Anand Bakshi) - Nishana 1980"
 "Main Nigahein Tere Chehre Se Hataoon Kaise Lut Gaye Hosh To Phir Hosh Mein Aaoon Kaise (Solo - Madan Mohan Kohli/Raja Mehdi Ali Khan) - Aap Ki Parchchaiyan 1964"
 "Main Pandit Tu Pathaan Ek Duje Se Qurban (Duet Manna Dey - Sonik-Omi/M. G. Hashmat) - Pandit Aur Pathaan 1977"
 "Main Pyar Ka Diwana (Solo - Shankar-Jaikishan/Hasrat Jaipuri) - Ayee Milan Ki Bela 1964"      [AA Aa Aa ...]
 "Main Pyar Ka Rahi Hoon Teri Zulf Ke Saaye Mein Kuch Der Thahar Jaoon Tum Ek Musafir Ho Sab Chhod Ke Chal Doge Yeh Soch Ke Ghabara Hoon Main Pyar Ka Rahi Hoon (Duet Asha Bhosle - O. P. Nayyar/Raja Mehdi Ali Khan) - Ek Musafir Ek Hasina 1962"
 "Main Rahi Anjaana Rahon Ka, Main Rahin Anjaana Rahon Ka, O Yaaron Mera Naam Anjaana, ..Main Panchhi Anjaana Bagon Ka, O Yaaron Mera Naam Anjaana (Solo - Laxmikant-Pyarelal/Anand Bakshi) - Anjaana 1969"      [O Ho O, O Ho O, O Ho O ...]
 "Main Ravan Lanka Naresh (Duet Manna Dey - C. Ramchandra/Rajendra Krishan) - Insaniyat 1955"
 "Main Riksha Wala Main Riksha Wala (Solo - Shankar-Jaikishan/Shailendra) - Chhoti Behen 1959"
 "Main Sharabi Nahin, Ankhon Se Peene Mein Kuch Kharabi Nahin (Duet Asha Bhosle - Laxmikant-Pyarelal/Anand Bakshi) - Khilona 1970"      [Ooth Gayi Mehfil, Bhooj Gayi Shamma, Dhal Gayi Raat, Gulabi Jaa, Ek Ghoont Bhi, Aur Na Tujh Ko, Peene Nahin Doongi, Sharabi Jaa Sharabi Jaa Sharabi Jaa   ...]
 "Main Shola Hoon (Duet Suman Kalyanpur - S. D. Burman/Shakeel Badayuni) - Benazir 1964"
 "Main Sooraj Ki Roshni (Duet Asha Bhosle - Manas Mukherjee/Vithalbhai Patel) - Shaayad 1979"
 "Main Soya Ankhiyan Meeche Aa Aa Teri Zulfon Ke Neeche Aa Aa Duniya Ko Bhul Diwani Ab Raha Zamana Peeche Hun Main Soya Ankhiyan Meeche Aa Aa (Duet Asha Bhosle - O. P. Nayyar/Qamar Jalalabadi) - Phagun 1958"
 "Main Sunta Hoon Tujhe (Solo - Ravi/Rajendra Krishan) - Khandaan 1965"
 "Main Suraj Hoon Tu Meri Kiran (Duet Asha Bhosle - Sonik-Omi/G. L. Rawal) - Dil Ne Phir Yaad Kiya 1966"
 "Main Suraj Ki Roshni Tu Chanda Ki Chandni (Duet Asha Bhosle - Manas Mukherjee) - Shaayad 1979"
 "Main Teri Gunahagar Hoon, Main Toojh Se Sharamsar Hoon, Par Maaf Karana Yaar, Main Phir Bhi Tera Pyar Hoon (Qawali Asha Bhosle and Omi - Sonik-Omi/Verma Malik) - Dharma 1973"
 "Main Teri Tu Mera Donon Ka Sang Sang Ho Basera (Duet Mohantara Talpade - Datta Davjekar/Mahipal) - Aap Ki Sewa Mein 1947"
 "Main To Baanke Nainowali Meri Baatein Hain Nirali Main Hoon Duniya Karein Mujh Se Pyar ..Aji Chhodo Yeh Fasana Jaaye Chulhe Mein Zamana Dekho Dil Hain Yanhaa Beqarar (Duet Asha Bhosle - O. P. Nayyar/Jaan Nisar Akhtar) - Chhoo Mantar 1956"
 "Main To Tere Haseen, Khayalon Mein Kho Gaya, Duniya Yeh Keh Rahi Hain, Ke Deewana Ho Gaya (Solo - Lala Asar Sattar/Aish Kanwal) - Sangram 1965"
 "Main To Teri Aankhon Mein Hain (Duet Asha Bhosle - Kalyanji-Anandji/Verma Malik) - Ek Se Badhkar Ek 1976"
 "Main Tooti Huyi Ek Naiyya Hoon Mujhe Chahe Jidhar Le Jao Ji Chahe Doobo Do Maujo Mein Ya Sahil Par Le Jao (Solo - Naushad Ali/Shakeel Badayuni) - Aadmi II  1968"
 "Main Tujh Se Milne Aayee (Duet Lata Mangeshkar - Kalyanji-Anandji/Indeevar) - Heera 1973 and Evergreen Mohd Rafi ****"
 "Main Tumhara Ho Liya (Duet Asha Bhosle - Shri Nath Tripathi/Qamar Jalalabadi) - Maya Jaal 1962"
 "Main Tumhin Se Poochhti Hoon 1 (Duet Lata Mangeshkar - N. Dutta aka Datta Naik/Jan Nisar Akhtar) - Black Cat 1959"
 "Main Woh Hi Woh Hi Baat (Solo - Laxmikant-Pyarelal/Rajendra Krishan) - Nayaa Din Nai Raat 1974"
 "Main Wohi Hoon (Waltz Duet Lata Mangeshkar) - Pyar Ka Sapna 1969"      [Ae Meri Zindagi Tu Nahin Ajnabi Tujh Koo Dekha Hai Pehle Kabhi ...]
 "Main Yahan Tu Kahan, Mera Dil Tujhe Pukare, Jhuki Jhuki Hai Nazar, Jhoome Jhoome Jigar, Koi Humein Kyun Pukare (Duet Lata Mangeshkar - Kalyanji Veerji Shah/Bharat Vyas) - Bedard Zamana Kya Jane 1959"
 "Main Yamla Jatt (Punjabi Duet Minoo Purushottam - Sardul Kwatra/Inderjeet Hasanpuri) - 50 Glorious Years Of Punjabi Film Music Vol. 1 ****"
 "Main Yeh Soch Kar Us Ke Dar Se Utha (Solo - Iqbal Qureshi/Kaifi Azmi) - Panchayat 1958"
 "Main Yeh Soch Kar Us Ke Dar Se Utha Tha Ke woh Rok Legi Mana Legi Mujh Ko Ke Hawaon Mein Lehrata Aata Tha Daman Ke Daman Pakad Le Bitha Legi Mujh Ko (Solo - Madan Mohan Kohli/Kaifi Azmi) - Haqeeqat 1964"      [Hun Hun Hun ...]
 "Main Zindagi Ka Saath Nibhata Chala Gaya (Solo - JaiDev/Sahir Ludhanvi) - Hum Dono 1961 and Hum Dono Rangeen 2011 and Kabul Express 2006"  (Radio played this song during travel scene of Kabul express)
 "Main Zindagi Mein Hardam Rota Hi Rahaan Hoon Tadpata Hi Rahaan Hoon (Solo - Shankar-Jaikishan/Iqbal Hasrat Jaipuri) - Barsaat 1949" (Rafi Sings For Raj Kapoor)
 "Makhan Chor Nand Kishore (Duet Lata Mangeshkar - R. D. Burman/Anand Bakshi) - Takkar 1980"
 "Mall Road Par Ghoom Rahein Hain, Baandh Gale Mein Tai, O Mr. Wai Mr. Wai Mr. Wai (Solo - Sudarshan/Viren Dablish) - Mall Road 1962"      [Padhe Likhe Kuchh Khaas Nahin, Par Naam Hain Mr. Wai ...]
 "Mama O Mama O Mama O Mama Mama Mama O Mama  ..Ghar Wale Khaye Chakkar, Aisa Hain Apna Chakkar, Chakkar Mein Tum Na Aana, O Mama (Duet Manna Dey - Dattaram/Hasrat Jaipuri) - Parvarish 1958"
 "Man Mera Tera Jogi (Solo - Hari-Arjun/Neeraj) - Aashiaana II 1974"
 "Man Mora Bawra (Solo - O. P. Nayyar/Jan Nisar Akhtar) - Raagini 1958"
 "Man Re Tan Hain Dukh Ka Gaon (Prayer - Unknown) - Hari Ka Dhyan Laga Man Mere 2008"
 "Man Re Tu Kahe Na Dheer Dhare Wo Moh Na Jane Jin Kaa (Solo - Roshan Lal/Sahir Ludhianvi) - Chitralekha 1964"
 "Man Tarpat Hari Darshan Ko Aai 1 (Prayer - Naushad Ali) - Baiju Bawra 1952 and Tere Bharose Nandlal 1991"      [Har-i Om Hari Om ...]
 "Man Tarpat Hari Darshan Ko Aai 2(Prayer - Naushad Ali) - Baiju Bawra 1952"      [Har-i Om Hari Om ...]
 "Mana Mere Hasin Sanam (Solo - G. S. Kohli/Yogesh Gaud) - The Adventures Of Robinhood 1965"
 "Mana Tum Na Rahoge Mana Hum Na Rahenge (Duet Asha Bhosle - Sardar Malik/Bharat Vyas) - Naag Jyoti 1963"
 "Mane Nahin Yeh Jiya Ki Umang Aaj Kahin Raja Chalo Mere Sang (Duet Asha Bhosle - R. D. Burman) - Ujala Hi Ujala 1975"
 "Manika Alo Alo Manika (Oriya - Prafulla Kar) - Sesa Srabana 1981"
 "Manmohan Man Mein (Multi S. D. Batish and Suman Kalyanpur  - S. D. Burman/Shakeel Badayuni) - Kaise Kahoon 1964"
 "Manmohana Man Mein Ho Tumhin Mano Ya Mano Na Ho Tumhin 1 (Janmashthami S. D. Batish and Suman Kalyanpur - S. D. Burman/Shakeel Badayuni) - Kaise Kahoon 1964"      [Aa Aa Aa ...]
 "Manmohana Man Mein Ho Tumhin Mano Ya Mano Na Ho Tumhin 2 (Janmashthami Solo - S. D. Burman/Shakeel Badayuni) - Kaise Kahoon 1964"      [Aa Aa Aa ...]
 "Mann Dole Nadi Kinare (Duet Shamshad Begum - Ghulam Mohammad) - Paras 1949"      [AraRaRa Jiyo O Jiyo O Jiyo ...]
 "Mann Ka Mouji Hoon Sanam Dil Hi Hain Dariya Ki Tarah (Duet Krishna Kalle - Shamji Ghanshamji) - Gaal Gulabi Nain Sharabi 1974"      [Are Samajhnewali Baat Bhi Nahin Hain  Aa Ha ...]
 "Mann Ke Gagriyan Mein Tu Chamka (Duet Lata Mangeshkar - Shri Nath Tripathi/Bharat Vyas) - Piya Milan Ki Aas 1961"
 "Mann Ke Khazane Mein Maya Hi Maya Jab Bhi Tu Chhaye Ise Lut Le (Prayer Solo - Sonik-Omi/Rajendra Krishan) - Teen Chor 1973"
 "Mann Ki Aankhon Se Main Dekhoon (Solo - Kamalkant/Uday Khanna) - Mahabali Hanuman 1980"
 "Mann Ki Been Matwari Baaje Aaja Jhoom Kar Jeevan Naache (Classical Lata Mangeshkar - Naushad Ali/Shakeel Badayuni) - Shabab 1954"
 "Mann Ki Suni Nagariya Suhani Bani (Duet Amirbai Karnataki - Tufail Faruqui/Khawar Zaman) - Sona Chandi 1946"
 "Manva Kaahein Dhir Ganwayein (Solo - Hansraj Behl/Naqsh Lyallpuri) - Pensioner 1954"
 "Manzil Bhi Door Hain (Duet Meera Shiraz - Nashad Ali/Farooq Qaiser) - Qatil 1960" ( (Nashad Ali was also known as Shaukat Ali, Shaukat Haidari, Shaukat Dehlvi, Shaukat Husain and Shaukat Husain Haidari.)
 "Manzil Ki Chah Mein ..Kahin Ghani Chhao Hain (Solo - S. D. Burman/Sahir Ludhianvi) - Devdas 1955"      [Raahi O O O Raahi, ...]
 "Mar Mar Ke Are Mar Mar Ke Chappal Meri Kar Di (Swing Asha Bhosle - O. P. Nayyar) - Basant 1960"      [Duniya Pakki Four-Twenty ...]
 "Mard E Momin Apne Imaan Se To (Solo - Shri Nath Tripathi/Prem Dhawan) - Sher Khan 1962"
 "Mareez E Ishq Hoon Ae Jaaneman Meri Dua Lena Main Mar Jaaoon To Meri Laash Ko Dulha Bana Dena (Duet Mahmood - Hemant Kumar/Shakeel Badayuni) - Bin Badal Barsaat 1963"
 "Marna Teri Gali Mein, Jeena Teri Gali Mein, Meet Jayegi Humari, Duniya Teri Gali Mein (Solo - Naushad Ali) - Shabab 1954"      [O O O O O O ...]
 "Marne Wale Zindagi Se Pyar Kar (Solo - Avinash Vyas/Bharat Vyas) - Grahalakshmi 1959"
 "Marya or Maria Kitlem Sobith Tu Maria (Goan Konkani Duet Lorna Lisboa - Chris Perry/Chris Perry) - Chris Perry - Golden Hits 1970"
 "Masoom Chehra Yeh Qatil Aadayein Ke Bemaut Maare Gaye Hum Bichare (Duet Lata Mangeshkar - Shankar-Jaikishan/Hasrat Jaipuri) - Dil Tera Diwana 1962"
 "Mast Aankhein Hain Ke Paimaane Do, Haaye Aaj To Mujh Ko Bahek Jane Do, Iss Mein Chhalka Ke Na Paimaane Do, Haaye Iss Tarah Hosh Mein Aa Jaane Do (Duet Asha Bhosle - Bipin Babul/Kaifi Azmi) - Naqli Nawab 1961"      [AA Aa Aa ...]
 "Mast Baharon Ka Main Aashiq, Main Jo Chahe Yaar Karoon, Chahe Gulon Ke Saayen Se Kheloon, Chahe Kali Se Pyaar Karoon, Sara Jahaan Hain Mere Liye Mere Liye, (Solo - Laxmikant-Pyarelal/Anand Bakshi) - Farz 1967"    [O Koo Koo, ..Koo Koo, ..Koo Koo ...]
 "Mast Kalandar DamaDam Mast Kalandar (Multi Master Sonik and Shamshad Begum - Hansraj Behl/Naqsh Lyallpuri) - Mast Kalandar 1955"
 "Mast Nazar Ki Katar, Dil Pe Utar Gayi Par, Inn Pyar Ki Rahon Mein, Dil Bhi Gaya, Hum Bhi Gaye Jakhamein Jigar Hain Bahar (Solo - Ramlal/Hasrat Jaipuri) - Sehra 1963"      [Laggi Mast Nazar Ki Katar, Haan Haan Haan ...]
 "Mastana Ada Behki Behki (Solo - Usha Khanna/S.H. Bihari-Azad Bhopali-Imam) - Trip To Moon or Chand Par Chaddhayee 1967"
 "Masti Jo Teri Aankhon Mein Hain (Duet Asha Bhosle - Kalyanji-Anandji/Verma Malik) - Ek Se Badhkar Ek 1976"
 "Masti Mein Chhed Ke Taraane Koi Dil Ka Aaj Lutaye Khazana Koi Dil Ka (Solo - Madan Mohan Kohli/Kaifi Azmi) - Haqeeqat 1964"      [O Ho Ho ..O Ho Ho ...]
 "Mat Bhool Are Insaan (Solo - Madan Mohan Kohli/Rajendra Krishan) - Mastana 1954"
 "Mat Bhool Ki Tu Ek Main Hain (Solo - Chitragupt/Prem Dhawan) - Bezuban 1962"
 "Mat Poochh Ke Kis Ke Ashiq Hain (Duet Asha Bhosle - Ravindra Jain) - Meharbani 1981"
 "Mat Poochh Mera Hain Kaun Watan Aur Main Kahan Ka Hoon, Sara Jahan Hain Mera, Main Saare Jahan Ka Hoon (Patriotic Solo - G. S. Kohli) - Mr. India 1961"
 "Mat Poochhiyein Dil Hain Kahan (Duet Mukesh - Chitragupt/Majrooh Sultanpuri) - Hum Matwale Naujawan 1961"
 "Mat Pyar Mein Dhokha Khana (Solo - Avinash Vyas/Bharat Vyas) - Aadhi Roti 1957"
 "Mat Ro Suhagan Tere Liye Ab Aansoo Bahana Hai Mana (Solo - Usha Khanna/Kavi Pradeep) - Naagin Aur Suhagan 1979"
 "Mat Samajh Muje Tu Kangaal (Duet Asha Bhosle - S. Mohinder/Bharat Vyas) - Do Dost 1960"
 "Mathe Ki Bindiya Bole Kahe 1 (Duet Anuradha Paudwal - Bappi Lahiri) - Lahu Ke Do Rang 1979"
 "Matlab Di Eh Duniya Yaaro Sari (Punjabi Solo - Ravi/Harbans Singh) - Pittar Pyare Nu **** and Sajjan Thug **** and Bemisaal - Mohd. Rafi 2005"      [O O O O O O ...]
 "Matlab Ki Iss Duniya Ka Hain Yeh Kaisa (Duet Asha Bhosle - Nisar Bazmi/Saba Afghani) - Halla Gulla 1954"
 "Matlab Nikal Gaya Hain To Pehchanate Nahin (Solo Qawali - Ravi/Sahir Ludhianvi) - Amaanat I 1975 and Mohammed Rafi Collection Vol. 6 ****"
 "Matwala Jiya Dole Piya Jhoome Ghata Chhaye Re Badal Karna Hain To Kar Pyar Na Dar Biti Umar Aayegi Na Kal Are Pagal Are Pagal (Duet Lata Mangeshkar - Naushad Ali/Shakeel Badayuni) - Mother India 1957"
 "Matwale Nainowale Kaahe (Duet Asha Bhosle - Jamal Sen/Shamshul Huda Bihari) - Rangeela 1953"
 "Matwali Ankhon Wale (Flamenco Dance Lata Mangeshkar - R. D. Burman/Shailendra) - Chhote Nawab 1961"      [Lahi-i-La Ya Ya, La La a, Oh Lara La La Lu-u-Lu-u, La a Ya Ya, Lara La La, La La La ...]      (First Released Album of Music Director R. D. Burman and first released film of Actor/Singer Lucky Ali)
 "Maujon Ka Ishara Hain, Maujon Ka Ishara Hain, Dekha Na Kinarein Ne  Haal Hamara Hain, Maujon Ka Ishara Hain, Toofan Ka Dar Kaisa Jab Paas Kinara Hain (Multi S. Balbir, Lata Mangeshkar and Shamshad Begum - Unknown/Unknown) - Naata 1955"      [O Ho Ho O Ho, O Ho Ho O Ho ..Dharke Dharke Reh Reh Ke Dil Bawra, Bheegi Bheegi Rut Hain Mausam Sawaray, Bheegi Bheegi Rut Hain Mausam Sawaray    ...]
 "Maujon Mein Chhupa Sahil (Duet Manna Dey - Lala Sattar) - Arabian Nights (Baghdad Ki Raatein and Panic In Baghdad) 1967"
 "Mausam Ho O O Mausam, Mausam Suhaane Aa Gaye Lo Pyar Ke Zamane Aa Gaye (Duet Asha Bhosle - Laxmikant-Pyarelal/Anand Bakshi) - Judaai 1980 and Evergreen Mohd Rafi ****"
 "Mausam Pe Jawani Hai (Duet Asha Bhosle - Laxmikant-Pyarelal/Anand Bakshi) - Do Premi 1980"
 "Maut Kabhi Bhi Mil Sakti Hain (Solo - O. P. Nayyar/Sahir Ludhianvi) - Sone Ki Chidiya 1958"
 "Maya Ka Aanchal Jale (Duet Usha Mangeshkar - JaiDev/Nyay Sharma) - Kinare Kinare 1963"
 "Maya Ka Sansar Hain Saara (Solo - Parmathi-Ashwatham/Sant Kabir) - Ram Aur Rahim 1968"
 "Mayoos Na Ho Ae Mere Watan (Solo - Rono Deb Mukherjee/Neeraj) - Tuhi Meri Zindagi 1965"
 "Mayuri Go Tuma Aakashe Mun (Oriya - Shantanu Mahpatra) - Unknown 1967"
 "Mazdoor Zindabaad (Solo - Usha Khanna/Asad Bhopali) - Mazdoor Zindaabaad 1976"      [Kaam Ki Puja Karanewale Mehnatse Na Darnewale ...]
 "Mazya Viraan Hridayin (Marathi Solo - Shrikant Thakre/Umakant Kanekar) - Navaras Sad ****"
 "Mee Marne Chala Hoon Main Marne Chala Hoon Ae Husn Teri Khatir Main Marne Chala Hoon (Duet Mahmood - Shankar-Jaikishan) - Gunahon Ka Devta 1967"      [Ho-shiyaar ..Are Khabardaar ..Main Ja Raha Hoon Main Marne Chala Hoon ...]
 "Mee Raksam Mee Raksam (Duet Chandrashekhar Gadgil - R. D. Burman/Nida Fazil) - Harjaee 1981"
 "Meet Mere Man Ke (Duet Sulakshana Pandit - Rajesh Roshan/Amit Khanna) - Unees Bees 1980"
 "Megha Re Bole Ghanan Ghanan (Classical Folk Song Solo - Usha Khanna/Majrooh Sultanpuri) - Dil Deke Dekho 1959"      [See "Bade Hain Dil Ke Kaale" ... Beginning portion]
 "Mehalon Mein Rahne Wale Humein Tere Dar Se Kya Nagri Hai Apni Pyari (Solo - Naushad Ali/Shakeel Badayuni) - Shabab 1954"
 "Mehanat Se Na Kabhi Daro ..Kaam Karo (Multi Asha Bhosle, Dilraj Kaur and Kumar Sonik - Sonik-Omi) - Bhookh 1978"      [Roshan Ho Jis Se Duniya Tu Woh Jalaal Ban Ja... ]
 "Mehanga Ho Ya Sasta Ho, Par Sauda Kar Lo Pyar Ka (Solo - Nisar Bazmi/Saba Afghani) - Pyara Dushman 1955"
 "Mehbooba Dil Walon Ki, Shahzadi Mere Khwabon Ki, Aashiq Hoon Mar Jaoonga, Zalim Ruk Ja Zara, Mehbooba Dilwalon Ki, Shahzadi Mere Khwabon Ki, Aashiq Hoon Mar Jaoonga, Zalim Ruk Ja Zara (Solo - Usha Khanna/Asad Bhopali) - Anjaan Hai Koi 1969"
 "Mehbooba Mehbooba (Solo - Kalyanji-Anandji/Qamar Jalalabadi) - Johar Mehmood in Hong Kong 1971"
 "Mehbooba Mehbooba Bana Leo Mijhe Dulha, Jala Deo Mera Dola (Duet Mehmood - Laxmikant-Pyarelal/Rajendra Krishan) - Sadhu Aur Shaitan 1968"      [Janiya, Are Kidhar Hain Re Tu, Mere Dil Ki Rani, Mere Nawabon Ki Nani, Aa Gaya Hoon Main, Are Dekh Le Main Aa Gaya, Permission Le Do ...]
 "Mehbooba Mehbooba Meri Mehbooba, Mehbooba Meri Mehbooba, Jab Se Tujhe Dekha Hain, Jab Se Tujhe Chaha Hain, Kuch Hosh Nahin Duniya Ka (Solo - Madan Mohan Kohli/Rajendra Krishan) - Kaise Kategi Zindagi Tere Bagair 2011" (Previously Unreleased)
 "Mehbooba Meri Roothi Jaayein (Solo - Usha Khanna/Asad Bhopali) - Woh Koi Aur Hoga 1967"
 "Mehbooba Teri Tasveer (Solo - S. D. Burman/Anand Bakshi) - Ishq Par Zor Nahin 1970 and Down Memory Lane -Mohammad Rafi **** and Mohammed Rafi Collection Vol. 4 *****"
 "Meherbani Meherbani (Duet Suman Kalyanpur - Snehal Bhatkar/Kedar Sharma) - Fariyad 1964"
 "Mehfil Mein Meri Kaun Yeh Deewana (Duet Lata Mangeshkar - C. Ramchandra/Rajendra Krishan) - Albela I 1951"
 "Mehfil Mein Sayano Ki Ek Diwana Aa Gaya ..Phir Na Kahana Diwana Sayanon Ko Diwana Bana Gaya (Multi Asha Bhosle and Usha Mangeshkar - Laxmikant-Pyarelal) - Khazana 1978 "
 "Mehfil Mein Shama Chamki Parwane Chale Aaye Ab To Nazar Jhuka Do (Classical Duet Manna Dey - Shankar-Jaikishan/Hasrat Jaipuri) - Gunahon Ka Devta 1967"      [Aa Aa Aa ..Aaye Hain Badi Door Se SarkAar Ke Liye Aa Aa Aa ..Kab Se Taras Rahe The Tere Didar Ke Liye Aa Aa Aa ..Bolo Kis Liye Aaye Ho ..NarAaz Na Ho SarkAar Hum To Iss Liye Aaye Hain ...]
 "Mehfil Mein Tera Diwana Aaya Hain, Aaya Hain, ..O O O O O O Mehfil Mein Teri Diwani Aayi Hain, Aayi Hain (Duet Jyoti Matwankar - Ratandeep-Hemraaj/Kulwant Jani) - Raakh Aur Chingari 1982"      [O O O O O O ...]
 "Mehfil Mein Tere Husn Ka Deewana Kaun Hain Yah Shamma Jaanti Hain Ki Parwana Kaun Hain (Duet Suman Kalyanpur - Nashad Ali/Farooq Qaiser) - Rooplekha 1962"      (Nashad Ali was also known as Shaukat Ali, Shaukat Haidari, Shaukat Dehlvi, Shaukat Husain and Shaukat Husain Haidari.)
 "Mehfil Mein Teri Aa Hi Rahe (Duet Asha Bhosle - Ravi/Sahir Ludhianvi) - Kaajal 1965"      [Kabira Nirbhay Ram Jati ..Soyega Din Raat ...]
 "Mehfil Se Uth Jane Walo (Solo - Roshan Lal/Sahir Ludhianvi) - Dooj Ka Chand 1964"
 "Mehka Mehka Roop Tumhara (Solo - Naushad Ali/Rajendra Krishan) - Ganwaar 1970"
 "Mehman Ban Ke Aaye The 1 (Solo - Aziz Hindi/Unknown) - Shaharat 1949"
 "Mehman Ban Ke Aaye The 2 (Duet Hamida Banu - Aziz Hindi/Unknown) - Shaharat 1949"
 "Mehnatkash Insaan Jaag Utha (Duet Asha Bhosle - S. D. Burman/Shailendra) - Insaan Jaag Utha 1959"
 "Mela Laga Hua Hain Maula Teri Gali Mein (Solo - Allah Rakha Qureshi/Shewan Rizvi) - Alam Ara I 1956"
 "Mela Laga Hua Hain Maula Teri Gali Mein (Solo - Allah Rakha Qureshi/Shewan Rizvi) - Parveen 1957"
 "Mera Ban Jaye Koi, Ae Meri Taqadeer Nahin, Main Woh Shisha Hoon Jis Mein Koi Tasveer Nahin (Solo - Usha Khanna/Asad Bhopali) - Ek Sapera Ek Lutera 1965"
 "Mera Bandar Chala Hain Sasural (Duet Kamal Barot - Dattaram Wadkar/Kavi Pradeep) - Zindagi Aur Khwab 1961"
 "Mera Bichhda Yaar Mila De Sudga Rusool Ka (Duet Lata Mangeshkar - Naushad Ali/Shakeel Badayuni) - Sohni Mahiwal 1958"
 "Mera Dil Aashiqana Hain Kabhi Is Par Nisar Kabhi Us Par Nisar Yeh To Zalim Diwana Hain ..Yeh To Jhoota Fasana Hain Kabhi Itna Guroor Nahin Karna Huzoor Bada Nazuk Zamana Hain (Qawali Type Duet Asha Bhosle - Ravi/Shakeel Badayuni) - Pyar Kiya To Darna Kya 1963"      [Bahot Haseen Hain Duniya Meri Nigahon Mein Jo Bas Chale To Loota Doonga Main Dil Ko Rahon Mein, Kyun Bhai Kis Liye, Is Liye Ke Mera Dil ...]
 "Mera Dil Ghabarayein, Meri Aankh Sharmayein, Kachhoo Samajh Na Aaye Re, Ke Tu Mera Kya Lage Re, O O O Tera Pyar Tadapayein, Mera Dum Ghabrayein, Kachhoo Samajh Na Aaye Re, Ke Tu Mera Kya Lage Re (Duet Asha Bhosle - O. P. Nayyar/Hasrat Jaipuri) - Mr. Qartoon M. A. 1958"
 "Mera Dil Ghayal Kar Ke Bairi Jag Se Dar Ke (Duet Binpani Mukherjee - Hansraj Behl/Surjit Sethi) - Bhikhari 1949"
 "Mera Dil Ghayal Kar Ke Bairi Jag Se Dar Ke (Duet Binpani Mukherjee - Hansraj Behl/Surjit Sethi) - Satyanarayan 1948"
 "Mera Dil Hain Tera, Tera Dil Hain Mera, Jab Se Hum Ne Dil Badle Hain Sara Jag Badla (Solo - Shankar-Jaikishan/Shailendra) - An Evening In Paris 1967"
 "Mera Dil Tujh Pe Qurbaan Hain (Solo - S. Mohinder/Manohar Khanna) - Naya Paisa 1958"
 "Mera Dil Tum Pe Aa Gaya, Mera Dil Tum Pe, Mere Pehloo Se Dil Gaya Gaya Gaya Gaya Gaya (Duet Ragini - Iqbal Qureshi/Qamar Jalalabadi) - Yeh Dil Kis Ko Doon 1963"      (Fun song mixed with Raj Kapoor, Dev Anand and Dilip Kumar act and refers to famous couples such as Shiri/Farhaad, Hiri/Raanza, Soni/Mahiwal and Laila/Majnu)
 "Mera Dulha Shehar Se Aaya Re (Multi Geeta Dutt and Sarla Devi - B. S. Kalla/Pandit Indra) - Do Dulhe 1955"
 "Mera Gadha Gadhon Ka Leader Kehta Hain Ki Dilli Jaa Kar Sab Maange Apni Kaam Ki Main Manwa Kar Aaoonga Nahin To Ghaans Na Khaoonga (Patriotic Duet Mahmood - Ravi/Rajendra Krishan) - Meharbaan 1967"      [Awan Awan Awan Awan Awan ...]
 "Mera Gadha Gadhon Ka Leader, Kehta Hain Ke Dilli Ja Kar, Sab Maange Apni Gaon Ki Main, Manwa Kar Aaoonga, Nahin To Ghaas Na Khaoonga, O Mera Gadha Gadhaonka Leader (Patriotic Mehmood - Ravi) - Mehrban 1967"      [(Gadha Bark) ]
 "Mera Haal-E-Dil Kaun Pehachanta Hain (Solo - Ghulam Mohammed/Shakeel Badayuni) - Ajeeb Ladki 1952"
 "Mera Husn Chamakta Sona (Duet Suman Kalyanpur - Nirmal Kumar/Anand Bakshi) - Lal Nishan 1959"
 "Mera Mann Hain Magan, Laagi Tum Se Lagan (Duet Asha Bhosle - Shri Nath Tripathi/Bharat Vyas) - Durga Pooja 1954"
 "Mera Mann Tera Pyasa (Solo - S. D. Burman/Neeraj) - Gambler 1971 and Eternal Sunshine Of The Spotless Mind 2004 and Mohammed Rafi Collection Vol. 4 ***** and Evergreen Mohd Rafi ****"
 "Mera Mijaaz Ladakpan Hain (Solo - C. Ramchandra/Rajendra Krishan) - Saqi 1952"
 "Mera Mijaz Ladkpan Se Aasikana Hain ..Mijaz Aashikana Hain (Solo - C. Ramchandra/Rajendra Krishnan) - Saqi 1952"      [Fazal Se Husn Barsti Likhi Thi Kismat Mein, Gujar Rahin Hain Meri Zindagi Mohabbat Mein ...]
 "Mera Mizaz Ladakpan Se Aashiqana Hai (Solo - C. Ramchandra/Chitalkar) - Saqi 1952"      [Ajal Se Husn Par Di Likhi Thi Kismat Mein Guzar Rahi ...]
 "Mera Mujh Mein Kichhu Nahin (Multi Jaspal Singh, Pascal Paul, Jagat Singh Jagga, Sudarshan Pandit and Asha Bhosle - Sardar Malik-Prem Nath/Qamar Jalalabadi) - Gyaani Ji 1977"
 "Mera Naam Anjano Mein (Multi Coca Cola and Asha Bhosle - Ram Laxman/Ravinder Rawal) - Ustadi Ustad Se 1982"      [Rehamattullah.. Rehamattullah..]
 "Mera Naam Fatafat Mera Kaam Jhatapat (Duet Shashi - S. Mohinder/Tanveer Naqvi) - Shahzada 1955"      (Nashad Ali also known as Shaukat Ali, Shaukat Haidari, Shaukat Dehlvi, Shaukat Husain and Shaukat Husain Haidari contributed to this album.)
 "Mera Nanha Sa Dil Hain (Duet Sudha Malhotra - Vinod/Deena Nath Madhok) - Oot Pataang 1955"
 "Mera Paighaam Mohabbat Ke Siwa Kuchch Bhi Nahin (Solo - Madan Mohan Kohli) - Tere Bagair 2010 (From Unreleased Film)"
 "Mera Paigham Mera Paigham Paigham Paigham Mera Paigham Muhobbat Ke Siwa Kuchh Bhi Nahin (Solo - Madan Mohan Kohli/Rajendra Krishan and Prem Dhawan) - Kaise Kategi Zindagi Tere Bagair 2011"      [Aaj Kuchh Kehna Hai Muj Ko Jo Izaazat Ho To ...] (Planned for Salma, but Previously Unreleased)
 "Mera Pyaar Jawaan (Solo - Iqbal Qureshi/Kaifi Azmi) - Dil Aur Patthar 1977"
 "Mera Rang De Basanti Chola (Solo - Husnlal-Bhagatram/Qamar Jalalabadi) - Shaheed Bhagat Singh 1963"
 "Mera Roop Mera Rang (Duet Asha Bhosle - Sonik-Omi/Verma Malik) - Who Main Nahi 1974"
 "Mera Salaam Le Lo (Solo - Rajkamal/Kulwant Jani) - Mera Salaam 1980 and Evergreen Mohd Rafi ****"
 "Mera Tenu Vi Salaam (Punjabi Solo - Sonik Omi/Verma Malik) - Bemisaal Rafi Vol. 3 ****"
 "Mera To Dil Dil Dil Ghabarayein Re Meri To Jaan Jaan Jaan Chali Jaayein Re (Duet Lata Mangeshkar - Dattaram Wadkar/Hasrat Jaipuri) - Kala Aadmi 1960"
 "Mera To Jo Bhi Kadam Hai Woh Teri Raah Mein Hai Ke Tu Kahin Bhi Tu Mere Nigah Mein Hai (Solo - Laxmikant-Pyarelal/majrooh Sultanpuri) - Dosti 1964 and Mohammed Rafi Collection Vol. 10 ****"  (World of difference in its tenor or feel of the song)
 "Mera Tujhe Bhi Salaam (Solo - Sonik-Omi/Verma Malik) - Premi Gangaram 1978"
 "Mera Tumhara Saath (Duet Suman Kalyanpur - Usha Khanna/Asad Bhopali) - Ek Paheli 1971"
 "Mera Yaar Bana Hain Dulha, Aur Phool Khile Hain Dil Ke, Are Mere Bhi Shadi Ho Jaye Dua Karo Sab Mil Ke (Qawali Solo - Ravi/Shakeel Badayuni) - Chaudhvin Ka Chand 1960"
 "Mere Aaka Hain Shahe Madina (Solo - Allah Rakha Qureshi/Asad Bhopali) - Sim Sim Marjina 1958"
 "Mere Aaka Hain Shahe Madina, Ab Yanhi Intejha Hain (Prayer - A. R. Qureshi) - Sim Sim Marjina 1958"
 "Mere Ae Ae Saqiya Mere Ae Ae Dilruba (Solo - C. RamChandra) - Rootha Na Karo 1970"[Maine Pee Hain Maine Pee Hain Sagar Bhi Hain Saqi Nahin Dil Mein Aata Hain Laga De Aaag Maikhane Mein Hum ..Aa Bhi Jaa ...]
 Mere Baba tu le chal madeenay mujhe Nahi haj karaya kisine mujhe.(broadcast over AIR Jalandhar)
 "Mere Bechain Dil Ko Chain (Solo - Kalyanji-Anandji/Anand Bakshi) - Aamne Saamne I 1967"
 "Mere Bhagwan Tu Mujh Ko Y00n Hi Barbaad Rehne De, Bas Itna Rehem Kar Mujh Par Mujhe Aabaad Rehne De (Prayer Solo - Shyam Sundar/Qamar Jalalabadi) - Bazaar 1949"
 "Mere Bhagya Ke Vidhaata Sukh Dukh Ke O Data (Solo - Shri Nath Tripathi/B. D. Mishra) - Brahma Vishnu Mahesh 1971"
 "Mere Budhape Ko Tum Cash Kar Lo  (60th Birthday Duet Asha Bhosle - Sonik-Omi/Verma Malik) - Apna Khoon 1978"
 "Mere Chahat (Solo - Ravi/Sahir Ludhianvi) - Mehmaan 1974"
 "Mere Desh Ke Rang Pyare (Holi Duet Anuradha Paudwal - Laxmikant-Pyarelal/Anand Bakshi) - Daku Aur Jawan 1978"      [Sab Ke Saron Pe ..Tiranga  ...]
 "Mere Desh Mein, Ho Mere Des Mein, Mere Des Mein, Pawan Chale Purvai, Mere Des Ko, Dekhne Bhai, Sari Duniya Aayi (Patriotic Bullock-cart - Laxmikant-Pyarelal/Anand Bakshi) - Jigri Dost 1969 and Mohammed Rafi Collection Vol. 4 ****"      [Ha Hurr Ha A A ..Ho Ho ...]
 "Mere Desh-Premiyo Aapas Mein Pyar Karo (Solo - Laxmikant-Pyarelal/Anand Bakshi) - Desh Premi 1982"      [Nafrat Ki Laathi Todo Lalach Ki Kanzar Phenko ...]
 "Mere Dil Door Bahut Door (Solo - Shankar-Jaikishan/Hasrat Jaipuri) - Naina 1973"
 "Mere Dil Ka Dil Meri Jaan Ki Jaan (Duet Asha Bhosle - C. Arjun/Qamar Jalalabadi) - Lambu In Hong Kong 1967"
 "Mere Dil Ke Aaine Mein Tasweer Teri Rehti Ha (Solo - Usha Khanna) – Aao Pyaar Karen 1964"
 "Mere Dil Ke Andar Jalati Hain Khanzar Bachalo Mujhe Us Nazar Se Bacha Lo (Qawali Solo - Ravi/Shakeel Badayuni) - Phool Aur Patthar 1966"      [AA Aa Aa ...]
 "Mere Dil Ke Musafir Khane Mein (Duet Shamshad Begum - Ghulam Mohammad/Shakeel Badayuni) - Hazaar Raatein 1953"
 "Mere Dil Ki Ho Mere Dil Ki Duniya Basa Di Kisi Ne (Duet Shamshad Begum - Ghulam Mohammad/Shakeel Badayuni) - Paras 1949"
 "Mere Dil Ki Sun Le Kahani (Duet Lata Mangeshkar - Laxmikant-Pyarelal/Anand Bakshi) - Chahat 1971"
 "Mere Dil Ko Jalaya Na Karo, O Mere Dil Ko Jalaya Na Karo, Tere Sang Bolte Nahin Na Bolo, Tere Sang Bolte Nahin Na Bolo, Mere Gali Mein Bhi, Mere Gali Mein Bhi Aaya Na Karo O Mere Dil Ko Jalaya Na Karo (Duet Shamshad Begum - Husnlal-Bhagatram/Qamar Jalalabadi) - Gauna 1950"
 "Mere Dil Ko Jis Ki Talash Thi Maine Woh Sitmgar Pa Liya Mere Har Aada Mein Hunar De Maine Woh Sitamgar Pa Liya (Duet Asha Bhosle - Ravi/Asad Bhopali) - Ustadon Ke Ustad 1963"
 "Mere Dil Mein Aane Wale (Duet Asha Bhosle - Madan Mohan Kohli/Rajendra Krishan) - Baap Bete 1959"
 "Mere Dil Mein Jo Hota Hai (Multi Kishore Kumar and Lata Mangeshkar - Rajesh Roshan/Aand Bakshi)- Aap Ke Deewane 1980"
 "Mere Dil Pe Andhera Sa Chha Ne (Solo - Usha Khanna/Indeevar) - Ek Phool Ek Bhool 1968"
 "Mere Dil Pe Laga De Darling Apne Naam Ki Chith Tere Mere Pyar Ki Film Bani To Ho (Duet Asha Bhosle - O. P. Nayyar/Qamar Jalalabadi) - Basant 1960"
 "Mere Dil Se Aa Ke Lipat Gayi Yeh Haseen Nigah Kabhi Kabhi (Duet Asha Bhosle - Madan Mohan Kohli/Raja Mehdi Ali Khan) - Neela Akash 1965 and Kaise Kategi Zindagi Tere Bagair 2011" (Previously Unreleased)
 "Mere Dildaar Ka (Duet Kishore Kumar - Laxmikant-Pyrelal/Sahir Ludhianvi) - Deedar E Yaar 1982"
 "Mere Dost Kissa Ye Kya Ho Gaya (Solo - Laxmikant-Pyarelal/Anand Bakshi) - Dostana 1980 and Evergreen Mohd Rafi ****"
 "Mere Dost Tujhe (Solo - Ravi/Ravi-Ali Jalili) - Dharkan 1972"
 "Mere Dushman Tu Mere Dosti Ko Tarase (Solo - Laxmikant-Pyarelal/Anand Bakshi) - Aaye Din Bahaar Ke 1966 and Mohammed Rafi Collection Vol. 3 ****"
 "Mere Geet Hain Anaam 1 (Solo - Laxmikant Pyarelal/Ram Bhardwaj) - Jurm Aur Sazza 1974"
 "Mere Geet Hain Anaam 2 (Solo - Laxmikant Pyarelal/Ram Bhardwaj) - Jurm Aur Sazza 1974"
 "Mere Geeton Ka Singaar (Solo - Khaiyyaam/Madhukar Rajasthani) - Unknown ****"
 "Mere Ghar Se Pyar Ki Palki 2 (Bidai Multi Manna Dey and Lata Mangeshkar - Naushad Ali/Shakeel Badayuni) - Palki 1967"
 "Mere Gore Gore Gaal (Classical Duet Shamshad Begum - O. P. Nayyar/Majrooh Sultanpuri) - Shrimati 420"      [Gulaabchand Ji Tere Jag Mein Samai Ho Nahin Sakti, Khudai Chhod De Tujh Se Khudai Ho Nahin Sakti, ..Hey Bhagwan Kis Jaye Base Ho Humri Khak Uday Humri Khak Uday, Aa Aa ...]
 "Mere Gore Gore Gaal (Duet Shamshad Begum - Ravi/Pyare Lal Santoshi) - Dulhan 1958"
 "Mere Gunah Maaf Kar Mere Yashu Mere Khuda Woh Mere Parmatma (Prayer - Shankar-Jaikishan/Rajendra Krishan) - Sachaai 1969"
 "Mere Haseen Saathiya (Duet Manorama or Zeenat Begum - Pandit Govind Ram/Noorpuri Sahib) - Mangti 1942"      (Ashraf Khan, the man who first introduced Rafi to Punjabi Film industry.)
 "Mere Hasraton Ki Duniya (Duet Krishna Kalle - Shyamji GhanShyamji/Kulwant Jani) - Gaal Gulaabi Nain Sharaabi 1974"
 "Mere Himalay ke Paasbano (Solo - Rono Deb Mukherjee/Neeraj) - Tuhi Meri Zindagi 1965"
 "Mere Huzoor (Train - Shankar-Jaikishan/Hasrat Jaipuri) - Mere Huzoor 1968"      [Apne Rukh Par Nigah Kar Ne Do Khoobsurat Gunah Kar Ne Do Rukh Se Parda Hatao Jaane Jaa ..Rukh Se Zara Naqaab Uthao Mere Huzoor Jalwa Phir Ek Baar Dikha Do  ...]
 "Mere Jaisa Nahin Milega, Ulfat Ka Diwana Koi, Parawana Dhoonde Sara Zamana (Multi Kishore Kumar and Madan Mohan Kohli - Madan Mohan Kohli/Rajendra Krishan) - Fifty Fifty 1956"
 "Mere Jaise Laakhon Tere (Solo - Chitragupt/Gopal Singh Nepali) - Sati Madalsa 1955"
 "Mere Jaisi Nahin Milegi (Bhangara Style Multi Ram Kamlani and Geeta Roy - Hansraj Behl/Deena Nath Madhok) - Khamosh Sipahi 1950"      [Hoy Hoy ..O O O ...]
 "Mere Kasid Tu Jab PahunChey (Duet Lata Mangeshkar - Jaidev/Sahir Ludhianvi) - Laila Majnu 1976"
 "Mere Kolo Bach Kurhiye (Punjabi Duet Asha Bhosle - Hansraj Behl/Verma Malik) - Jatta Aai Visakhi Vol. 1 ****"
 "Mere Lahange Mein Ghungharu Laga De To Phir Meri Chaal Dekh Le (Duet Asha Bhosle - O. P. Nayyar/Qamar Jalalabadi) - Basant 1960"
 "Mere Liye Aati Hain Shyaam Chanda Bhi Hain Mera Gulaam Dharti Se Sitaron Tak Hain Mera Intezaam Raton Ka Raja Hoon Mein (Solo - R. D. Burman) - Raton Ke Raja 1970"
 "Mere Mann Mein Hain Ram, Mere Tan Mein Hain Ram, Mere Nainon Ki Nagariya Mein Ram Hain (Prayer Solo - Chitragupt/S. K. Deepak or Gopal Singh Nepali) - Hanuman Pataal Vijay 1951, Pawan Putra Hunuman 1957 and Hanuman Chalisa 1969"      [Aadh Wahi Hain Ant Wahi Hain, Rama Hua Kan Kan Mein Ram Yug Jayenge Yug Aayenge Amar Rahega Prabhu Ka Naam, Raghupati Raghav Rajaram Patit Pawan Sitaram ... ]
 "Mere Mehboob (Solo - Sonik-Omi/Shakeel Badayuni) - Beti 1969"
 "Mere Mehboob Mere Saath Hi Chalna (Solo - N. Dutta aka Datta Naik/Kaifi Azmi) - Gyara Hazar Ladkiyan 1962"
 "Mere Mehboob Tere Dam Se (Solo - Shankar-Jaikishan/Hasrat Jaipuri) - Bhai Bhai 1970"
 "Mere Mehboob Tujhe Meri Mohabbat Ki Kasam Phir Mujhe Nargisi Aankhon Ka Sahara De De (Gazal Solo - Naushad Ali/Shakeel Badayuni) - Mere Mehboob 1963"
 "Mere Mehboob Tujhe Salam, Salam Salam Salam (Duet Asha Bhosle - Laxmikant-Pyarelal) - Baghawat 1982"
 "Mere Mehboob Tum Ho (Duet Asha Bhosle - Laxmikant-Pyarelal/Majrooh Sultanpuri) - Ladies Tailor 1981"
 "Mere Mitwa Mere Meet Re 1 (Duet Lata Mangeshkar - Kalyanji-Anandji/Anand Bakshi) - Geet 1970"
 "Mere Mitwa Mere Meet Re 2 (Solo - Kalyanji-Anandji/Anand Bakshi) - Geet 1970"
 "Mere Paas Aao (Solo - Vithal Mumtaz/Javed Qadri) - Dukh Sukh 1974"
 "Mere Paas Aao Mere Bhole Sajan Ji (Multi Chitalkar, Lata Mangeshkar and Shamshad Begum - C. Ramchandra/Pyare Lal Santoshii) - Roshni 1949"
 "Mere Pairon Mein Ghunghroo Bandhade To Phir Meri Chaal (Solo - Naushad Ali/Shakeel Badayuni) - Sangharsh 1968"      [Dil Paaya Albela Maine Tabiyat Meri Rangilee Aaaj Khushi Mein Maine Bhaiyaa Thodishi Bhung Peeli ...]
 "Mere Pardesi Mehmaan Kaha Mera Maan Ye Hat Ab Chod De (Duet Shamshad Begum - Avinash Vyas/Bharat Vyas) - Andher Nagri Chaupat Raja 1955"
 "Mere Pehloo Mein Aa Ke (Solo - Hansraj Behl/Qamar Jalalabadi) - Rustom E Hind 1965"
 "Mere Pyar (Duet Lata Mangeshkar - Kalyanji-Anandji/Verma Malik) - Raj Mahal 1982"
 "Mere Pyar Ka Aaj Mahurat Hai (Duet Asha Bhosle - Sonik-Omi) - Shahar Se Door 1972"      [Aye Kaliyon Muskurao ..Aji Kya Baat Hain ...]
 "Mere Pyar Ki Aawaz (Duet Lata Mangeshkar - Kalyanji-Anandji/Verma Malik) - Raj Mahal 1982"
 "Mere Pyar Mein Tujhe Kya Mila Tere Dil Ka Phool Na Khil Saka (Solo - Madan Mohan Kohli/Hasrat Jaipuri) - Suhagan 1964"
 "Mere Raam Kahan Ho Tum ..Meri Praan Kahan Ho Tum (Duet Sudha Malhotra - Chitragupt/Gopal Singh Nepali) - Hanuman Pataal Vijay 1951, Pawan Putra Hunuman 1957 and Hanuman Chalisa 1969"
 "Mere Sajre Haaniyan (Punjabi Duet Savita Suman - Unknown/Munsif) - Bemisaal Vol. 2 **** and Bemisaal by Mohd. Rafi 2005"      [O O O O O O ..Ho O O O ..Aa Aa Aa Ho O O Aa Aa Aa ...]
 "Mere Sakhiya Mere Dilruba (Solo - C. Ramchandra/Hasrat Jaipuri) - Rootha Na Karo 1970"
 "Mere Sapnon Ki Rani Tum Nahin Ho Tum Nahin Ho Tum Nahin Ho Woh Hai Sidhi Sadhi (Solo - Shankar-Jaikishan/Hasrat Jaipuri) - Jawan Muhabbat 1971"
 "Mere Sapnon Ki Rani, Roohi Roohi Roohi (Duet K. L. Saigal - Naushad Ali) - Shahjehan 1946"      [Aankhen Neendon Ke Khazane Hain, Do Ulfat Ke Paimaane Hain, Zulfen Raaton Ki Jawaani ...]    (Unique song of 2 legends for the following 2 reasons:  (1) This song was from the last second movie of the legend K. L. Saigal before his death during the early 1940s due to alcohol dependency; and, (2) Then newcomer and now legend, Mohammed Rafi is in the Chorus as well as in the end lines of this song.)
 "Mere Sathiyan So Naa Jaa Na Kahin Salamat (Duet Kishore Kumar - Laxmikant-Pyarelal) - Dostana 1980"
 "Mere Shyam Tera Naam Bole Man Subah Shyam (Janmashthami - Unknown) - Hari Ka Dhyan Laga Man Mere 2008"
 "Mere Yaar Ki Yaari Dekh Ke (Duet Suman Kalyanpur - Shankar-Jaikishan/Hasrat Jaipuri) - Insaniyat 1974"
 "Mere Yaar Tu (Solo - Hemant Kumar) - Love In Canada 1979"
 "Mere Yaar Ye Din Ho Mubarak Tujhe Mil Gayi Hain Tujhe Ik Nayi Zindagi Tujhe Aur Main Kya Doon Nazarana Hain Teri Khushi Mein Hi Meri Khushi (Bidai Amit Kumar - Kalyanji-Anandji/Gulshan Bawra)- Neeyat 1980"      [Ho ...]
 "Mereia Malika (Punjabi - S. Mohinder) - Ladlee 1979"      [Tara Toote Ka Raat Ki Vit Ke Jakham Jiya Lag Jaye .. O ...]
 "Meri Aankhon Ke Taare (Solo - Datta Davjekar/Mahipal) - Aap Ki Sewa Mein 1947"
 "Meri Aankhon Ke Ujale Meri Rahat Mere Bhai Mere Bhai Meri Ummeed Ke Tare Mere Kismat Mere Bhai (Brother-to-Brother Solo - Sonik-Omi/G. L. Rawal) - Aabroo III 1968"
 "Meri Aankhon Ki Nindiya Choora Le Gaya Tumhare Siwa Kaun Tumhare Siwa Kaun Baaton Baaton Mein Dil Ko Uda Le Gaya Tumhare Siwa Kaun Tumhare Siwa Kaun (Duet Lata Mangeshkar - Shankar-Jaikishan) - Jhuk Gaya Aasman 1968"
 "Meri Aawaz Suno Zara Sa Rag Suno (Solo - Madan Mohan Kohli/Kaifi Azmi) - Naunihal 1967 and Mohammed Rafi Collection Vol. 8 ****"
 "Meri Barbadi (Qawali Lata Mangeshkar - Naushad Ali) - Chambal Ki Rani - 1979"      [Fariyad Karein Hum...]
 "Meri Biwi Jahaan Se Nirali Hain (Solo - Laxmikant Pyarelal/Anand Bakshi) - Subha-O-Shaam 1972"
 "Meri Chahat Rahegi Humesha Jawan, Jism Dhalne Se Zazabaat Dhalte Nahin, Meri Chahat Rahegi Humesha Jawan, Jism Dhalne Se Zazabaat Dhalte Nahin, Maut Aane Se Bhi Pyaar Marta Nahin Dum Nikalne Se Armaan Nikalte Nahin (Solo - Ravi/Sahir Ludhianvi) - Mehman 1970"
 "Meri Chhod De Kalahi Kalahi Saiyaan Ja Ja Ja Meri Chhod De Kalahi Balam More Ja Ja Chhod De Kalahi Kalahi Saiyaan Ja O Wa Wa Wa Kaise Chhod Doon Kalahi Kalahi Tori Wa Wa O Meri Lugai Lugai Yanhan Aa (Engagement Asha Bhosle - O. P. Nayyar/Qamar Jalalabadi) - Phagun 1958"      [Aa Aa Aa Aa ..Ja Ja ..Ja ...]
 "Meri Dosti Mera Pyar (Solo - Laxmikant-Pyarelal/Majrooh Sultanpuri) - Dosti 1964 and Mohammed Rafi Collection Vol. 6 and 10 ****"     [Koi Jab Raah Na Paye Mere Sang Aaye ...]
 "Meri Dulhan Aayi (Duet Asha Bhosle - Ganesh/Asad Bhopali) - Sub Ka Ustad 1967"
 "Meri Duniya Loot Rahi Thi Aur Main Khamosh Tha Tukde Tukde Dil Ka (Qawali Solo - O. P. Nayyar/Majrooh Sultanpuri) - Mr. and Mrs. 55 (Fifty Five) 1955"
 "Meri Duniya Mein Tum Aayi 1 (Multi Lata Mangeshkar, Priya and Rajkumar - Madan Mohan Kohli/Kaifi Azmi) - Heer Ranjha 1970"
 "Meri Dushman Hain Yeh, Meri Uljhan Hain Yeh, Bada Tadpati Hain, Dil Tarsati Hain, Yeh Khidki, Khidki Yeh Khidki, Yeh Khidki Jo Band Rahti Hain, Yeh Khidki Jo Band Rahti Hain, Meri Dushman Hain Yeh, Meri Uljhan Hain Yeh, Bada Tadpati Hain, Dil Tarsati Hain, Yeh Khidki, Khidki Yeh Khidki, Yeh Khidki Jo Band Rahti Hain, Yeh Khidki Jo Band Rahti Hain (Solo - Laxmikant-Pyarelal/Anand Bakshi) - Main Tulsi Tere Angan Ki 1978"
 "Meri Gaadi (Duet Geeta Dutt - Bullo C. Rani/Saba Afghani) - Black Tiger 1960"
 "Meri Gaadi Udan Khatola (Solo - Ravi/Shakeel Badayuni) - Aurat II 1967"
 "Meri Gali Chhokare Ji (Duet Geeta Dutt - Chitragupt/Majrooh Sultanpuri) - Hum Matwale Naujawan 1961"
 "Meri Ghaghri Nu (Duet Shamshad Begum - Hansraj Behl/Prem Dhawan) - Saawan 1959"
 "Meri Gudiya Ko Gudda Le Jayega Le Jayega Bada Maza Aayega Behna Ki Shadi Mein Bada Maza Aayega (Rakhi - Ravindra Jain) - Dhokebaaz 1984"
 "Meri Hasraton Ki Duniya Tum Mile Kahin Jo Mujh Ko Tu Mile Kahin Jo Mujh Ko Tu Mile Kahin Jo Mujh Ko Seene Se Laga Loo Tujh Ko (Duet Krishna Kalle - Shamji Ghanshyamji/Kulwant Jaani) - Gaal Gulabi Nain Sharabi 1974"
 "Meri Hirni Jaisi Chaal 1 (Duet Asha Bhosle - Madan Mohan Kohli/Rajendra Krishan) - Jailor 1958"
 "Meri Hirni Jaisi Chaal 2 (Duet Asha Bhosle - Madan Mohan Kohli/Rajendra Krishan) - Jailor 1958"
 "Meri Jaan Baaton Mein Bol Zara (Solo - Chitragupt/Kafil Azar) - Toofan Aur Bijlee 1976"
 "Meri Jaan Balle Balle (Engagement Asha Bhosle - O. P. Nayyar/Shamshul Huda Bihari) - Kashmir Ki Kali 1964"      [Haaye Re Haaye Yeh Mere Haath Mein Tera Haath Naye Jazbaat ...]
 "Meri Jaan Gair Ko Tum Paan Khilaya Na Karo O O O, ..Meri Jaan Gair Ko Tum Paan Khilaya Na Karo, Meri Jaan Gair Ko Tum Paan Khilaya Na Karo, Mere Armaan Bhare Dil Ko Jalaya Na Karo, O Jalaya Na Karo, O Jalaya Na Karo, ..Jao Ji Muft Mein Yun Hum Ko Sataya Na Karo, Jao Ji Muft Mein Yun Hum Ko Sataya Na Karo, Jeb Khali Ho To Bazar Mein Aaya Na Karo, Aji Aaya Na Karo, Aji Aaya Na Karo (Paisa Duet Geeta Dutt - Ghulam Mohammad/Shakeel Badayuni) - Kundan 1955"      [O O O O O O ...]
 "Meri Jaan Hain Sona (Duet Asha Bhosle - Sonik-Omi/Kafil Azar) - Mehmil 1972"
 "Meri Jaan Meri Jaan Main Jaanta Hoon (Solo - Kalyanji-Anandji/Anand Bakshi) - Kahin Pyar Na Ho Jaye 1963"
 "Meri Jaan Meri Jaan Meri Jaan Apne Aashiq Ko Satana Kis Se Sikha Hain, Jo Tum Par Jaan De Us Ko Mitana Kis Se Sikha Hain, Suno Ji [Sunao] Suno Ji Suno Ji Peeche Peeche Roz Aana Kis Se Sikha Hain, Meri Galiyon Ke Chakkar Roz Lagana Kis Se Sikha Hain, Meri Jaan Hut Meri Jaan Chachal Hut (Duet Lata Mangeshkar - Shankar-Jaikishan/Hasrat Jaipuri) - Mere Huzoor 1968"
 "Meri Jaan Na Sata Tu, O Mera Jee Na Jala Tu, Karoon Kya Kuch Bata De, Dil Pe Nahin Hain Kabu (Solo - Ravi/Sahir Ludhianvi) - Bahu Beti 1965"
 "Meri Jaan Tu Khafa Hai To Kya Hua Yeh Sitam Yeh Aaada Hain To Kya Hua ..Husn wale To Khuda Se Bhi Rooth Jaate Hain (Solo - R. D. Burman/Anand Bakshi) - Teesra Kaun 1965"
 "Meri Jaan Uff Meri Jaan (Solo - Usha Khanna/Asad Bhopali) - Faisla 1965"
 "Meri Jholi Ko Bhar De (Duet Shamshad Begum - Sardar Malik/Raja Mehdi Ali Khan) - Maa ke Aansoo 1959"
 "Meri Kahani Bhoolane Wale Tera Jahaan Aabaad Rahe (Bidai Solo - Naushad Ali/Shakeel Badayuni) - Deedar 1951"
 "Meri Kamini O Meri Ragini Dharti Pe Chaand Laoon (Duet Chandrani Mukherjee - Chitragupt/Prahlad Sharma) - Prem Ki Ganga 1971"
 "Meri Laash Ki Mitti (Solo - Sonik-Omi/Sajan Dehlvi) - Badla Aur Balidan 1980"
 "Meri Lut Gayi Duniya Pyar Ki (Solo - Hansraj Behl/Deena Nath Madhok) - Khamosh Sipahi 1950"
 "Meri Mehboob Kahin Aur Mila Kar Mujh Se (Solo - Madan Mohan Kohli) - Gazal 1964"      [Taj Tere Liye, Ik Majhare Ulfat Hi Sahi, Tujh Ko Iss Wadiye, Rangeen Si Haqiqat Sahi ...]
 "Meri Mehfil Mein Aa Ke Dekh Le (Duet Asha Bhosle - Ravi/Shakeel Nomani) - Tu Nahin Aur Sahin 1960"
 "Meri Mohabbat Jawan Rahegi, Sada Rahi Hain, Sada Rahegi, Tadap Tadap Kar Yehin Kahegi, Sada Rahi Hain, Sada Rahegi (Engagement Solo - Shankar-Jaikishan/Hasrat Jaipuri) - Janwar 1965 and Mohammed Rafi Collection Vol. 5 ****"
 "Meri Mohabbat Kabool Kar Lo (Urdu Gazal Solo - Khaiyyaam or Taj Ahmad Khan/Khawar Zaman) - Yaadgaar Ghalein Vol. 1 **** and Mohd. Rafi Ghazals Vol. 2 **** and  This Is Mohd Rafi Saab -Ghazala And Bhajans **** and Finest Ghazals ****"
 "Meri Mohabbat Pak Mohabbat, Aur Jahaan Ki Khak Mohabbat, Kahin Tumhein Pyar Na Ho Jaye, To Bach Bach Ke Chalna Huzoor (Solo - Shankar-Jaikishan/Hasrat Jaipuri) - April Fool 1964"
 "Meri Mohabbat Teri Jawani (Solo - Laxmikant Pyarelal/Anand Bakshi) - Anjaana 1969"
 "Meri Morni Sach Kehta Hoon (Duet Usha Khanna - Usha Khanna/Asad Bhopali) - Night In Calcutta 1970"
 "Meri Nigah Ne (Solo - Khayyam/Majrooh Sultanpuri) - Mohabbat Isko Kahte Hain 1965"
 "Meri Nigah Ne (Solo - Manas Mukherjee/Nida Fazil-Aish Kanwal) - Lubna 1982"
 "Meri Nigah Ne Kya Kaam Laajwaab (Duet Nirmala - O. P. Nayyar) - Musafir Khana 1955"
 "Meri Padosan Hain Dil Ki Dushman (Solo - Usha Khanna/Asad Bhopali) - Simla Road 1969"
 "Meri Pehli Aarzoo Ka Yeh Salaam (Duet Asha Bhosle - Ravi/Qamar Jalalabadi) - Pyar Ka Bandhan 1963"
 "Meri Raani Mat Ja Pyaar Tujhe Kar Loon Gussa Itna Achha Nahin (Swing Duet Preeti Sagar - Satyam/Keval) - Kaun Sachcha Kaun Jhootha 1972"
 "Meri Raaton Ka Mahtab Tu Hain (Duet Lata Mangeshkar - Ganesh/Asad Bhopali) - Smuggler 1966"
 "Meri Rahon Se Juda Ho Gayi Rahein Unki (Solo - N. Dutta aka Datta Naik/Sahir Ludhianvi) - Chandrakanta 1956"
 "Meri Sakhi Bata (Duet Chitalkar - C. Ramchandra/Rajendra Krishan) - Hungama 1952"
 "Meri Sakhiyon Bolo Zara Mukhada To Kholo Batlao Iss Pagal Ko Ab Hum Kya Saza De Mil Ke Insaaf Kar Do Kar Do Na Insaaf Kar Do (Duet Asha Bhosle - R. D. Burman) - Mela 1971"
 "Meri Sune To O Pardesi Dil Se Dil Takarane De Are Bhala Lage To Gale Se Lag Ja Bura Lage To Jane De (Duet Lata Mangeshkar - N. Dutta aka Datta Naik/Sahir Ludhianvi) - Naach Ghar 1959"
 "Meri Tasveer Le Kar Kya Karoge Tum (Qawali Multi S. Balbir and Asha Bhosle - N. Dutta aka Datta Naik/Sahir Ludhianvi) - Kala Samundar 1962"
 "Meri Vinti Suno Bhagwan (Solo - Hemant Kumar/Rajendra Krishan) - Taj 1956"
 "Meri Zindagi Hain Tu (Duet Asha Bhosle - S. Mohinder/Surji Sethi) - Paapi (Papi) 1953" (Rafi sings for Raj Kapoor)
 "Meri Zindagi Mein Aate To Kuchh Aur Baat Hoti, To Kuchh Aur Baat Hoti, Yeh Naseeb Jagmagate, To Kuchh Aur Baat Hoti (Bidai Solo - Shankar-Jaikishan/Hasrat Jaipuri) - Kanyadan 1968 and Mohammed Rafi Collection Vol. 1 ****"      [Un Ki Zulfein Un Ke Chehre Se Hata Sakta Nahin, Dil Ki Betaabi Kisi Surat Chhoopa Sakta Nahin, Kitni Dilkash Hain Mohabbat Ki Jawaan Majbooriyan, Samane Manzil Hain Aur Paon Badha Sakta Nahin ...]
 "Meri Zindagi Tere Pyar Mein Hum Kahan Khan Se Gujar Gaye Mere Dil Se Aaye Teri Sada Hum Jahan Jahan Se Gujar Gaye (Scooter Suman Kalyanpur - Kalyanji-Anandji/Hasrat Jaipuri) - Ji Chahta Hai 1964"      [O O O O O O ..Aa Aa Aa O O ...]
 "Mil Gaya Dhoondte Jise (Multi Usha Mangeshkar and Udit Narayan - Rajesh Roshan) - Unees Bees 1980"
 "Mil Gaya Mil Gaya (Multi Udit Narayan and Usha Mangeshkar - Rajesh Roshan/Amit Khanna) - Unnees Bees 1980"
 "Mil Gaya Taqdeer Se Chashma (Solo - Ghulam Mohammed/Shakeel Badayuni) - Laila Majnu 1953"
 "Mil Gayi Mil Gayi ..Meri Sapanon Ki Rani Muj Ko Mil Gayee Mil Gayee O Khul Gayi Tum Mile To Meri Kismat Khul Gayee Khul Gayee (Twist Asha Bhosle - Shankar-Jaikishan/Hasrat Jaipuri) - Jawan Muhabbat 1971"      [Ho ...]
 "Mil Gayi Mil Gayi Mil Gayi Re Mujh Ko Mohabbat Mil Gayi, Aakhir Dukh Te Dil Ko Mere Dard Se Fursat Mil Gayi (Solo - Shankar-Jaikishan) - Pyar Mohabbat 1966"        [Husn Ko Chaand-Jawani Ka Kanwal Kehte Hain Koi Surat Nazar Aaye To Gazal Kehte Hain Otri Satri Yatri Yatri Yana ...]
 "Mil Jaati Hain Sansaar Mein Sansaar Se Mukti ..Pyar Hain Ek Nishan Kadamon Ka 1 (Solo - R. D. Burman) - Mukti 1977"
 "Mil Kar Jaayein Hum Preet Ke Deewane (Duet Shamshad Begum - S. Mohinder/Hamid Khumar) - Jeevan Sathi 1949"
 "Mil Ke Baitho Jodo Bandhan (Solo - Iqbal Qureshi/Shakeel Nomani) - Panchayat 1958"
 "Mil Le Mil Le Mil Le Mujhe Chhu Nahin Waise Hi Mil Le, Dil Le Dil Dil Le Mere Seene Se Lag Mera Dil Le (Duet Asha Bhosle - Ravi) - Paisa Ya Pyar 1969"
 "Mil Mil Ke Gaayenge O Ho Do Dil Yanhaan Ek Tera Ek Mera Hun Hun Haa Haa (Duet Lata Mangeshkar - Naushad Ali/Shakeel Badayuni) - Dulari 1949"
 "Mil Ne Ki Hasrat Mein Betaabi (Solo - Ghulam Mohammad/Shakeel Badayuni) - Laila Majnu 1953"
 "Mile Jo Kadi Kadi Ek Zanzeer Bane Pyar Ke Rang Bharo Zinda Tasveer Bane (Multi Kishore Kumar and Asha Bhosle - R. D. Burman/Gulshan Bawara) - Kasme Vaade 1978"
 "Mile Khak Mein Naujawan Kaise Kaise (Solo - Chitragupt/Prem Dhawan) - Chaalbaaz 1958"
 "Mile Na Phool To Katon Se Dosti Kar Li Isi Tarah Se Basar Hum Ne Zingi Kar Li (Solo - Roshan Lal/Kaifi Azmi) - Anokhi Raat 1968 and Mohammed Rafi Collection Vol. 3 ****"
 "Mili Khaak Mein Mohabbat, Jala Dil Ka Aashiyana, Jo Thi Aaj Tak Haqiqat, Wohin Ban Gayi Fasana (Solo - Ravi/Shakeel Badayuni) - Chaudhvin Ka Chand 1960 and Mohammed Rafi Collection Vol. 2 and 8 ****"
 "Milta Hain Kya Namaz Mein (Prayer Solo - S. Qureshi/Shewan Rizvi) - Arab Ka Sitara I 1946"
 "Milte Hi Nazar Tum Se Hum Ho Gaye Diwane Aaraj To Accha Hain Anjaam Khuda Jaane Haaye Anjaame Mohabbat Mein Tum Ho Abhi Begane Sholon Se Uljhate Ho Diwane Ho Diwane (Qawali Manna Dey and Asha Bhosle - Ravi/Asad Bhopali) - Ustadon Ke Ustad 1963"      [AA Aa Aa ...]
 "Milti Hain Agar Nazron Se Nazar Sharmaate Ho Kyon (Duet Asha Bhosle - O. P. Nayyar/Raja Mehdi Ali Khan) - Do Dilon Ki Daastan 1966"
 "Mister Dil Badi Mushkil (Duet Asha Bhosle - O. P. Nayyar/Raja Mehdi Ali Khan) -
 "Mister Dil Badi Mushkil Mein Tu Ne Aaj Dala Hawa Behki Sama Chikna Ajab Jadu Nirala Jigi Jigi Jigi (Duet Asha Bhosle - O. P. Nayyar/Raja Mehdi Ali Khan) - Jaali Note 1960"       [Oh ...]
 "Mitter Pyare Noon (Punjabi Solo - S. Mohinder/Shabad Gurbani) - Nanak Naam Jahaz Hai ****"
 "Mitti Mein Mil Gaya Hain (Solo - Ravi/Rajendra Krishan) - Modern Girl 1961"
 "Mizaj E Garami Dua Hai Aapki Badi Khoobsurat Ada Hai Aapki Badi Khoobsurat Nighah Aapki  (Duet Lata Mangeshkar - Laxmikant-Pyarelal/Anand Bakshi) - Jaal 1967"      [O Ho Ho Ho ...]
 "Mizaz To Huzur Ke Hain Achhe (Duet Asha Bhosle - Madan Mohan Kohli/Rajendra Krishan) - Minister 1959"
 "Mohabbat Choome Jinke Haath Jawani Pao Padi Din Raat Sune Phir Haye Kis Ki Baat (Solo - Naushad Ali/Shakeel Badayuni) - Aan I 1952"
 "Mohabbat Hi Mohabbat Hain Jahaa Tum Ho Jahaa Hum Hai Chale Aao Chale Aao (Solo - Laxmikant-Pyarelal/Rajendra Krishan) - Geeta Mera Naam 1974"
 "Mohabbat Ho Gayi Bas Ek Nazar Se ..Bas Ek Nazar Se (Duet Lata Mangeshkar - C. Ramchandra/Rajinder Krishan) - Sagai 1951"      [Udhar Se Tum Chale Aur Hum Idhar Se, ..Mohabbat Ho Gai ...]
 "Mohabbat Ho Gayi Hain (Solo - Usha Khanna/Asad Bhopali) - Sone Ka Dil Lohe Ke Haath 1978"
 "Mohabbat Hui Mere Saiyyan, Nainon Mein Nindiya, Sapne Mein Tu Tujh Mein Main Hoon (Duet Usha Mangeshkar - Rajesh Roshan/Verma Malik) - Shakka 1981"
 "Mohabbat Jata Ke Ankhen Lada Ke, Chale Aa Rahe Hain Hazamat Kara Ke (Funny C. Ramchandra - C. RamChandra/Rajendra Krishan) - Sagai 1951"      [Haseen-on Ke Gadi Mein Aashiq Ka Ghoda Bedard Kismat Ke Haathon Ne Joda...]
 "Mohabbat Ka Haath Jawani Ka Pala Subhan Aallah Babu (Asha Bhosle - O. P. Nayyar/Qamar Jalalabadi) - Howrah Bridge 1958"      [Aa Aa Aa ...]
 "Mohabbat Ka Naghma Zuban Par Na Aata Agar Tum Na Milte Muqaddar Na Jaane Kahan Le Ke Jaata (Duet Asha Bhosle - Ravi/Shakeel Badayuni) - Pyar Kiya To Darna Kya 1963"
 "Mohabbat Kar Ke Kya Loge (Duet Asha Bhosle - G. S. Kohli/Anjaan) - Lambe Haath 1960"
 "Mohabbat Kar Ke Kya Loge, Aji Badle Mein Kya Doge (Duet Asha Bhosle - G. S. Kohli) - Lambe HAath 1960"      [Aa Aa Aa ...]
 "Mohabbat Kar Ke Kya Loge, Aji Badle Mein Kya Doge, Aa Aa ..Yeh Aisa Raaz Hain Jis Ko, Mohabbat Kar Ke Samajhoge, Yeh Aisa Raaz Hain Jis Ko O O O (Duet Asha Bhosle - G. S. Kohli) - Lambe Haath 1960"      [Hun Hun Hun ..Aa Aa Aa ..Hun Hun Hun ...]
 "Mohabbat Kar Lo, Jee Bhar Lo, Aji Kis Ne Roka Hain, Par Bade Gajab Ki Baat Hain, Iss Mein Bhi Dhokha Hain, Shikayat Kar Lo, Ji Bhar Lo, Aji Kis Ne Roka Hain, Ho Sake To Duniya Chhod Do, Duniya Bhi Dhokha Hain, Shikayat Kar Lo (Duet Geeta Dutt - O. P. Nayyar/Majrooh Sultanpuri) - Aar Paar I 1954"
 "Mohabbat Kar Ne Waalon Se (Multi Mukesh and Shamshad Begum - Ghulam Mohammad/Shewan Rizvi) - Hanste Ansoo 1950"
 "Mohabbat Karo To Karo Chhup Chhupa Ke (Qawali Duet Asha Bhosle - N. Dutta aka Datta Naik/Sahir Ludhianvi) - Kala Samundar 1962"      [Aa Aa Aa ...]
 "Mohabbat Ke Dhaage Mein Kaliyan (Multi Jaani Babu Qawwal and S. Balbir - Kamal Rajasthani/Mehboob Sarwar) - Mere Gharib Nawaaz 1973"
 "Mohabbat Ke Dhokhe Mein Koi Na Aaye (Solo - Husnlal-Bhagatram/Rajendra Krishan) - Badi Bahen 1949"
 "Mohabbat Ke Khuda Hum Hai Khuda Hum Hai (Solo - Shankar-Jaikishan) - Brahmchari 1967"      [Koi Humein Bhi Karta Hai Hum Pe Bhi Koi Marta Hai ...]
 "Mohabbat Ke Liye Aise To Tanhai Jaruri Hai.. Mohobbat Main Negahonse (Qawali Sulakshana Pandit - Laxmikant-Pyarelal) - Amar Shakti 1978"
 "Mohabbat Ke Maaron Ka, Mohabbat Ke Maaron Ka, Haal Yeh Duniya Mein Hota Hain, Zamana Un Pe Hansta Hain, Naseeba Un Pe Rota Hain, Naseeba Un Pe Rota Hain, Naseeba Un Pe Rota Hain (Duet Asha Bhosle - Roshan Lal/Kedar Sharma) - Bawre Nain 1950"
 "Mohabbat Ke Suhane Din Jawani Ki Haseen Raatein Judai Mein (Solo - Kalyanji-Anandji/Anand Bakshi) - Maryaadaa 1971"
 "Mohabbat Ke, Dhage Mein Kaliya Phiro Ke (Qawali Prayer Jani Babu and S. Balbir - Kamal Rajsthani/Mehboob Sarwar) - Mere Gharib Nawaz 1973"      [Yeh Chaadar Khata Kosh Ufawa Banengi, Yeh Mehsharmi, Khudrat Ka Saaya Banegi, Jo Simati Gunahon Ka Parda Banegi, Jo Phaili To Rehmat Ka Darya Banegi ...Kya Shaan Tumhari Allah-oo ..Chadhane Ko Aaaye Hain Mannat Ki Chaadar ...]
 "Mohabbat Ki Ankhon Se Aaj (Duet Aarti Mukherji - Vistas Ardeshir Balsara/Prahlad Sharma) - Wohi Ladki 1967"
 "Mohabbat Ki Bas Itni Dastaan Hai Bahare Bahare Char Din Ki Phir Fiza Hain (Duet Lata Mangeshkar - Nashad Ali/Khumar Barabankvi) - Baradari 1955"      [Sitare Doob Chale Raat Dhalnewali Hain Ae Ae Chale Bhi Aao Ki Duniya Badal Ne Wali Hain Tumhe Kasam Hain Na Karna Meri Judai Ka Ghum Hawayein Lakh Chale Shamma Jalnewali Hain ...]       (Nashad Ali was also known as Shaukat Ali, Shaukat Haidari, Shaukat Dehlvi, Shaukat Husain and Shaukat Husain Haidari.)
 "Mohabbat Ki Rahon Mein Chalna Yanhan Jo Bhi Aaya Gaya Haath Mul Ke (Solo - Naushad Ali/Shakeel Badayuni) - Uran or Udan Khatola 1954"
 "Mohabbat Kis Ko Kehte Hain, Mohabbat Is Ko Kehte Hain, Bin Dekhe, Aur Bin Pehchaane, Tum Par Hum Qurbaan, Mohabbat Kis Ko Kehte Hain, Mohabbat Is Ko Kehte Hain, Gar Tum Par Na Mar Te To Jina Tha Aasaan, Mohabbat Kis Ko Kehte Hain, Mohabbat Is Ko Kehte Hain (Solo - Shankar-Jaikishan/Shailendra) - Jab Pyar Kisi Se Hota Hai 1961"      [Bin Dekhe, Aur Bin PehchAane, Tum Par Hum QurbAan ...]
 "Mohabbat Mein Aji Kya Aap Apna Intahaan Denge Nahin Hum Apni Jaan Denge (Duet Lata Mangeshkar - R. D. Burman/Anand Bakshi) - Phandebaaz 1978"
 "Mohabbat Mein Khudaya Aise Guzare Zindagi Apni, Woh Nafarat Bhi Karein To Kum Na Ho Ho Ulfat Kabhi Apni, Unhi Ko Sonp Di Hain Maine Sari Zindagi Apni (Solo - Ameerbai Karnataki/Ameer Usmani Deobandi) - Shahnaz 1948"
 "Mohabbat Mein Kise Maloom Tha Yeh Din Bhi Aayenge (Duet Shamshad Begum - Ghulam Mohammad/Shakeel Badayuni) - Paras 1949"
 "Mohabbat Mein Nigahon Se (Duet Sulakshana Pandit - Laxmikant-Pyarelal/Anand Bakshi) - Amar Shakti 1978"
 "Mohabbat Rang Layegi Janaab Ahista Ahista (Duet Chandrani Mukherjee - Anu Malik/Hasrat Jaipuri) - Poonam 1981"
 "Mohabbat Rog Ban Kar (Duet Shamshad Begum - S. Mohinder/Hamid Khumar) - Jeevan Sathi 1949"
 "Mohabbat Se Dekha Khafa Ho Gaye Hain Haseen AajKal Ke Khuda Ho Gaye Hain (Solo - Roshan Lal/Majrooh Sultanpuri) - Bheegi Raat 1965"
 "Mohabbat Se Tumhein Dekha Magar Tum Jaane Kya Samajhe Jo Itna Bhi Nahin Samajhe Sanam To Phir Tum Se Khuda Samajhe (Duet Lata Mangeshkar - R. D. Burman/Majrooh Sultanpuri) - Raaton Ka Raja 1970"
 "Mohabbat Yun Bhi Hoti Hain (Duet Asha Bhosle - N. Dutta aka Datta Naik/Sahir Ludhianvi) - Marine Drive 1955"
 "Mohabbat Zinda Rehti Hain (Solo - Hansraj Behl/Qamar Jalalabadi) - Changez Khan 1957"
 "Mohammed Rafi Tu Bahut Yaad Aaya (Tribute Solo Sung By Mohammed Aziz - Laxmikant Pyarelal/Anand Bakshi) - Kroadh 1990"    (Ek Shaam Rafi Ke Naam)
 "Mohammed Shah Rangile Re (Duet Lata Mangeshkar - Shri Nath Tripathi/Majrooh Sultanpuri) - Nadir Shah 1968"
 "Mohan Main Ek Bhatka Raahi (Solo - Chitragupt/Majrooh Sultanpuri) - Baraat 1960"
 "Mohobbat Karegi Asar Dhire Dhire (Solo - Chitragupa/Kafil Azar) - Mohammed Rafi: The Last Songs "      (Planned Hindi remake of a 1962 Bengali film with the name, "Sorry Madam" by Dilip Bose was never made, because it may have been considered as bad-luck due to loss of Dilip Bose's wife and financial hardship. The music, however, was recorded just seven months before Rafi's death. The music was restored by Frenchman Achille Forler of a music publishing company, Deep Emotions in a joint venture with Universal Music. Frenchman sent the tapes to Equus Studios in Belgium to restore and released the album in 11-2-2010 by Silk Road Communications with an additional Track "Teri Ada", which gives audio documentary from Dilip Bose's sons Bobby [and may be Rajesh] and Chitragupt's sons Anand-Milind. Frenchman told Deccan Herald that he was prepared to do shirshasana for one year to have a Rafi album in his catalogue and its catlogue # is SR025 and the file is under Hindi Memorabilia. )
 "Mor Bhangiya (Duet Asha Bhosle - Sapan-Jagmohan/Indeevar) - GangaDhaam 1980"
 "More Raja Ho Le Chal Nadiya Ke Paar (Duet Lalita Deulkar- C. Ramchandra/B. A. Moti) - Nadiya Ke Paar 1949"      [O O O O O O Ha Ha Ha ...]
 "More Ram Re Tori Nagri Ajab Veerani (Solo - Chitragupt/Prahlad Sharma) - Prem Ki Ganga 1971"
 "More Shyam Pal Pal Mere Mukh Se Nikle (Non-Filmy Bhajan Solo - Khayyam/Unknown) - This Is Mohd Rafi Saab -Ghazala And Bhajans **** and BhaktiGeet **** and Tere Bharose Nandlal 1991"
 "Mori Binti Suno Bhagwan Ab Mori Binti Suno Bhagwan Aaj Meri Tuti Beena Mein Phir Se Dalo Pran (Prayer - Hemant Kumar) - Taj 1956"      [Aa Aa Aa ...]
 "Mubarak Aap Ko Yeh Din Khushinyo Bhara (Piano Duet Asha Bhosle - Laxmikant-Pyarelal/Anand Bakshi) - Do Bhai 1969"      [Geet Nahin Ban Sakte Kuch Saad Aise ...]
 "Mubarak Ho Dulha Dulhan Ko Yeh Shaadi (Solo - Ghulam Mohammed/Shakeel Badayuni) - Paak Daman 1957"
 "Mud Mud Ke Har Koi Dekhein (Solo - Sardar Malik/Hasrat Jaipuri) - Mera Ghar Mere Bachche 1960"
 "Muddat Hui Hain Yaar Ko Mehmaan Kiye Huye (Urdu Gazal Solo - Muhammad Zahoor Khaiyyam Hashmi or Kedar Pandit, S D Burman, Anupam Shobhaka/Mirza Ghalib) - Mohad Rafi Ghazals Vol. 2 and Rafi Aye Jaan E Ghazal **** or Kalaam-E-Ghalib: Ghazals By Lata/Rafi **** or Mirza Ghalib ****"
 "Muhabbat Ka Nagma Juban Par Na Aata Agar Tum Na Milte (Duet Asha Bhosle - Ravi/Shakeel Badayuni) - Pyar Kiya To Darna Kya 1963"
 "Mujh Ko Apne Gale Laga Lo Aye Mere Humrahi, Mujh Ko Apne Gale Laga Lo Aye Mere Humrahi, Tum Ko Kya Batalaoon Main Ke Tum Se Kitna Pyar Hain, Mujh Ko Apne Gale Laga Lo Aye Mere Humrahi, Mujh Ko Apne Gale Laga Lo Aye Mere Humrahi, Tum Ko Kya Batalaoon Main Ke Tum Se Kitna Pyar Hain, Mujh Ko Apne Gale Laga Lo (Duet Mubarak Begum - Shankar-Jaikishan/Hasrat Jaipuri) - Humrahi 1963"
 "Mujh Ko Bacha Lo Meri Maa (Duet Asha Bhosle - R. D. Burman/Majrooh Sultanpuri) - Garam Masala 1972"
 "Mujh Ko Jeene Ki To (Solo - Laxmikant-Pyarelal/Majrooh Sultanpuri) - Naach Uthe Sansaar 1976"
 "Mujh Ko Kasam Hain Saakiya (Duet Asha Bhosle - Sonik-Omi/Inderjeet Singh Tulsi) - Zamaanat 1977"
 "Mujh Ko Tujh Ko Do Geenate ..Hum Hain Ek Aur Ek Gyarah (Duet Kishore Kumar - Laxmikant-Pyarelal) - Ek Aur Ek Gyarah 1980"
 "Mujh Se Mat Rootho Meri Jaan 1 (Solo - Jaidev/V. N. Mangal) - Sapna 1969"
 "Mujh Se Nazarein Mila Ne Ki Jurrat Naa (Duet Manna Dey - Sonik-Omi/Verma Malik) - Maan Gaye Ustad 1981"
 "Mujh Se Nazarein Milane Ki Juraat Na Kar Yeh Nasha Hain Jawani Ka Utar Jayega (40 th or 60 th Birthday Qawali Manna Dey - Sonik-Omi) - Maan Gaye Ustaad 1981"      [Duniya Ke Liye Main Aafat Hoon Mere Samne Tu Koi Cheez Nahin Tere Baap Ke Main To Barabar Hoon Kya Itni Tujhe Tameez Nahin ...]
 "Mujh Se Sham Suhani (Duet Asha Bhosle - Usha Khanna/Ravindra Jain) - Meri Biwi Ki Shaadi 1979"
 "Mujhe Akhiyon Pe Apni Yakin Hain Tu Duniya Mein Sab Se Haseen Hain (Duet Asha Bhosle - O. P. Nayyar/Raja Mehdi Ali Khan) - Do Dilon Ki Daastan 1966"
 "Mujhe Apna Yaar Banalo Phir Ho Jaoon Sansaar Ka Are Azama Ke Dekho Dil Kaisa Hai Dildaar Ka (Train Solo - Shankar-Jaikishan/Hasrat Jaipuri) - Boy Friend 1961"
 "Mujhe Apni Sharan Mein Le Lo Ram (Prayer Solo - Chitragupt/Gopal Singh Nepali) - Tulsidas 1954"
 "Mujhe Bhool Jana (Solo - Laxmikant-Pyarelal/Anand Bakshi) - Taqdeer 1967"
 "Mujhe Chhoo Nahin Waise (Duet Asha Bhosle - Ravi/Sahir Ludhianvi) - Paisa Ya Pyar 1969"
 "Mujhe Chhoo Rahi Hain Teri Garam Sansen (Duet Lata Mangeshkar - Rajesh Roshan/Gulzar) - Swayamvar 1980 and Evergreen Mohd Rafi ****"
 "Mujhe Dard-E-Dil Ka Pata Na Tha, Mujhe Aap Kis Liye Mil Gaye, Main To Akele Yun Hi Nashe Mein Tha, Mujhe Aap Kis Liye Mil Gaye (Solo - Chitragupt/Majrooh Sultanpuri) - Aakash Deep 1965 and Down Memory Lane - Mohammad Rafi ****"
 "Mujhe De Do (Duet Hemlata - Ravindra Jain) - Meharbani 1981"
 "Mujhe Dekh Kar Aap Ka Muskarana, Mohabbat Nahin Hain To Phir Aur Kya Hain, Ho Muje Dekh Kar Aap Ka Muskurana (Solo - O. P. Nayyar/Shamshul Huda Bihari) - Ek Musafir Ek Hasina 1962"     [Hun Hun Hun ..Aap Ka Muskurana ...]
 "Mujhe Dekh Na Kudiyein Mud Ke (Duet Asha Bhosle - S. Mohinder/Anjaan) - Reporter Raju 1962"
 "Mujhe Dekho Hoti Der Khade (Duet Lata Mangeshkar - N. Dutta aka Datta Naik/Jan Nisar Akhtar) - Mr. John 1959"
 "Mujhe Dena Re, Mujhe Dena Re Badhai Gaowalon, Ke Yaar Mera Rab Ho Gaya, Rab Ho Gaya (Multi Badri Prasad, Anand Kumar C and Asha Bhosle - Kalyanji-Anandji/Raj Kavi Inderjeet Singh Tulsi) - Ahinsa II 1979"      [Haye ..Dhamak Dhamak Dham Dholak Baaje Goonj Uthi Shehnai, Tulsi Ki Ramayan Mein Bhi Baat Yanhi Batalai ..Raam Ko Mili Badhai, Are Badhai Ho ..Aa Aa Aa ...]
 "Mujhe Dosto Tum Gale Se (Duet Danny Denzongpa - R. D. Burman/Anand Bakshi) - Naya Daur 1978"
 "Mujhe Duniyawalon Sharabi Na Samajho (Waltz Solo - Naushad Ali/Shakeel Badayuni) - Leader 1964"      [La Ra La La La Ra La ..Ha Ha Ha Shoo o ...]
 "Mujhe Gale Se Laga Lo Bahut Udas Hoon Main 1 (Duet Asha Bhosle - Ravi/Sahir Ludhianvi) - Aaj Aur Kal II 1963"
 "Mujhe Ishq Hain Tujhi Se Tujhi Se Mere Jaan-E-Zindagani Tere Paas Mera Dil Hain Mere Pyar Ki Nishani (Solo - Ravi/Shakeel Badayuni) - Umeed 1971"
 "Mujhe Jaldi Bana De Malika Phir Maalik Ban Mere Dil Ka (Duet Suman Kalyanpur - Dattaram Wadkar/Gulshan Bawra) - Dark Street 1961"
 "Mujhe Kitna Pyar Hai Tum Se Apne Hi Dil Se Puchho Tum (Duet Lata Mangeshkar - Shankar-Jaikishan/Shailendra) - Dil Tera Diwana 1962"
 "Mujhe Le Chalo Aaj Phir Us Gali Mein Jahan Pehle Pehle Yeh Dil Ladkhadaya O Duniya O Meri Mohabbat Ki Duniya Jahan Se Main Betaabiyaan Le Ke Aaya (Solo - Madan Mohan Kohli/Rajendra Krishan) - Sharabi 1964"      [Hun Hun Hun ...]
 "Mujhe Mat Roko Mujhe GAane Do Jo Hota Hai Ho JAane Do (Solo - Laxmikant-Pyarelal/Anand Bakshi) - Sargam 1979"      [Aa Aa Aa ...]
 "Mujhe Mera Pyar De De Tujhe Aazama Liya Hai Teri Wafa Ke Aage Maine Sar Jhuka Liya Hai (Engagement Asha Bhosle - O. P. Nayyar/Shewan Rizvi) - Hum Saaya 1968"
 "Mujhe Mil Gaya Bichhda Yaar (Multi Manna Dey and Asha Bhosle - Sonik-Omi/Sajan Dehlvi) - Badla Aur Balidan 1980"
 "Mujhe Preet Nagariyaan Jaana Hain (Duet Lata Mangeshkar - S. D. Burman/Rajendra Krishan) - Ek Nazar 1951"
 "Mujhe Pyar De Do Maa, Apna Dular De Do Maa, Mera Kho Gaya Hain Bachpan, Udhar De Do Maa (Duet Usha Mangeshkar - C. Arjun/Kavi Pradeep) - Aankh Ka Tara 1977"
 "Mujhe Pyar Ka Tohfa De Ke Tapti Bahin Mein Leke (Duet Usha Mangeshkar - Rajesh Roshan/Sahir Ludhianvi) - Kaala Patthar 1979"
 "Mujhe Pyar Ki Zindagi Denewale Kabhi Gum Na Dena Khushi Denewale (Duet Asha Bhosle - Ravi/Prem Dhawan) - Pyar Ka Sagar 1961"
 "Mujhe Tadpaati Rahi Roz Sataati Rahi (Duet Asha Bhosle - Hemant Bhosle/Yogesh Gaud) - Damaad 1978"
 "Mujhe Teri Mohabbat Ka Sahara Mil Gaya Hota (Duet Lata Mangeshkar - Laxmikant-Pyarelal/Anand Bakshi) - Aap Aye Bahaar Ayee 1971"      [Dil Shaad Tha  ...]
 "Mujhe Tu Ne Maar Dala (Solo - Shankar-Jaikishan/Hasrat Jaipuri) - Naina 1973"
 "Mujhe Tum Se Mohabbat Hain (Solo - Sardar Malik/Hasrat Jaipuri) - Bachpan 1963"
 "Mujhe Tum Se Mohabbat Hain, Mujhe Tum Se Mohabbat Hain, Mujhe Tum Se Mohabbat Hain (Duet Ameerbai Karnataki - Ameerbai Karnataki/Fiza Kausar Bangalori) - Shahnaz 1948"      [Aa Aa Aa ...]
 "Mujhe Yeh Phool Na De Tujh Ko Dilwari Ki Kasam Dilwari Ki Kasam Yeh Kuch Nahin Kuch Nahin Kuch Nahin Tere Hoton Ki Sadagi Ki Kasam (Duet Suman Kalyanpur - Madan Mohan Kohli/Sahir Ludhianvi) - Ghazal 1964"
 "Mujhi Mein Chhupkar Mujhi Se Door (Duet Asha Bhosle - Madan Mohan Kohli/Rajendra Krishan) - Jailor 1958"
 "Mujhko Apne Gale Laga Lo Aye Mere Hamrahi (Duet Mubarak Begum - Shankar-Jaikishan) - Humrahi 1963"
 "Mujhko To Qatil Ki Itni Pehchaan Hain (Multi Sudesh Kumar and Asha Bhosle - Kalyani-Anandji/M. G. Hashmat) - Uljhan 1975"
 "Mukhde Pe Tere Bijli Ki Chamak or Chal Tham ke zara (Solo - Chitragupt/Prem Dhawan) -Adhi Raat Ke Baad 1965"
 "Mulaqaton Ki Ummeed Purani Ho Rahi Hogi (Duet Asha Bhosle - Bullo C. Rani/Gopal Singh Nepali) - Veer Rajputani 1955"
 "Munde Da Main Mama Ban Gaya (Child Birth Duet Lata Mangeshkar - Laxmikant-Pyarelal/Anand Bakshi) - Jeet 1972"
 "Munh Se Mat Laga, Cheez Hain Buri, Dekh Bas Zara, Cheez Hain Buri, Chhod De Yeh Maikashi, Mere Humnashi, Mere HumNashi, Are Baat Mat Badha Chhod Dillagi, Hosh Kar Zara, Chhod Dillagi, Jhoot Bolta Hain Tu, Main Ne Pee Nahin, Main Ne Pee Nahin ..Lu Ra Ra Ru Lu Ra Ra Ru (New Year Games Swing Manna Dey - O. P. Nayyar/Hasrat Jaipuri) - Johnny Walker 1957"
 "Muqabala Hain Aaj Mera (Qawali Usha Mangeshkar - Shyamji GhanaShyamji) - Heroein Ek Raat Ki 1979 (May be released in 1994)
 "Muqabla Hum Se Na Karo, Muqabala Hum Se Na Karo, Hum Tumhein Apne Hi Rang Mein Rang Dalenge Ek Hi Pal Mein (Dance Jugal-Bandi Multi Asha Bhosle and Lata Mangeshkar - Shankar-Jaikishan) - Prince 1969"     (Dance Jugal Bandi Between Vaijayantimala and Helen)
 "Muqaddar Azmana Chahta Hoon Tumhe Apna Banana Chahta Hoon Mujhe Bas Ek Pyar Ka Jaam De Do Main Sab Kuch Bhool Jana Chahta Hoon (Solo - Ravi/Shakeel Badayuni) - Door Ki Awaz 1964"
 "Murakh Hain Insaan Bhagwan Murakh Hain Insaan Bhagwan Bure Bhale Ka Gyan Rakhena Bure Bhale Ka Gyan Rakhena Apna Kamaye Naam Naam Naam Re (Prayer - C. Arjun) - Main Aur Mera Bhai 1961"      [Insaan Ki-tne Yug Beete Yunhi Raha Nadan Yunhi Raha Nadan ...]
 "Musaafir Hain Hum Tum Yeh Duniya Saare (Multi Sudha Malhotra and Mubarak Begum - Allah Rakha Qureshi/Asad Bhopali) - Sim Sim Marjina 1958"
 "Musaafir Hain Hum Tum Yeh Duniya Saray (Multi Mubarak Begum and Sudha Malhotra - A. R. Qureshi) - Sim Sim Marjina 1958"
 "Musaafir Rahkar Paida Khuda Manzil Banayega (Duet Asha Bhosle - S. Mohinder/Rahil Gorakhpuri) - Sun Le To Haseena 1958"
 "Musaafir Sada Geet Gaaye Chala Chal (Duet Shamshad Begum - Husnlal-Bhagatram/Pandit Sudarshan) - Jal Tarang 1949"
 "Museebat Itni Jheli Hain Ki (Solo - Sardul Kwatra-T. K. Das/M. A. Taj) - Jalte Deep 1950"
 "Mushaira II (Duet Chandbala - Ghulam Mohammadd/Shakeel Badayuni) - Paak Daman 1957"
 "Muskurati Huyi Ek Husn Ki Tasveer Ho Tum (Duet Asha Bhosle - Shankar-Jaikishan/Hasrat Jaipuri) - Daaman Aur Aag 1973"
 "Muskurayein Khet Pyase Tarse (Duet Suman Kalyanpur - Iqbal Qureshi/Rajendra Krishan) - Love In Simla 1960"
 "My Dear Mummy Nahin Hain (Duet Shamshad Begum - Shankar-Jaikishan/Shailendra) - Nageena 1951"
 "My Love Panzi Wongo (Swing - Daan Singh) - My Love 1970"       [Yeh Tumharein Raaste Mein Phool Kyun Khilati Nahin, Yeh Tumharein Har Kadam Mein Nain Kyun Bichhati Nahin, Kya Patta Nahin Iss Bahar Ko Tum Kaun Ho Tum Mera Pyaar Ho, ...]

See also 
 List of songs recorded by Mohammed Rafi
 Recorded songs (A)
 Recorded songs (B-C)
 Recorded songs (D-F)
 Recorded songs (G)
 Recorded songs (H-I)
 Recorded songs (J)
 Recorded songs (K)
 Recorded songs (L)
 Recorded songs (N)
 Recorded songs (O)
 Recorded songs (P-R)
 Recorded songs (S)
 Recorded songs (T)
 Recorded songs (U-Z)

M
Rafi, Mohammed